= List of Proton launches (1965–1969) =

This is a list of launches made by the Proton rocket between 1965 and 1969. All launches were conducted from the Baikonur Cosmodrome. The list includes the first five launches, which were conducted under the designations UR-500 and UR-500K, before the selection of the name Proton.

== Launches ==
Date/time (UTC)	Configuration	Serial number	Launch pad	Outcome
Date/time (UTC)	Payload	Separation orbit	Operator	Function
Date/time (UTC)	Remarks			
=== 1965 ===
16 July 1965; 11:16	UR-500 8K82	107207-01	Site 81/23	Successful
16 July 1965; 11:16	Proton 1 (N-4 #1)	Low Earth		Particle research
16 July 1965; 11:16	Maiden flight of UR-500 8K82			
2 November 1965; 12:28	UR-500 8K82	UR500-209	Site 81/23	Successful
2 November 1965; 12:28	Proton 2 (N-4 #2)	Low Earth		Particle research
=== 1966 ===
24 March 1966; 21:00	UR-500 8K82	UR500-211	Site 81/23	Failure
24 March 1966; 21:00	N-4 #3	Low Earth (intended)		Particle research
24 March 1966; 21:00	2nd stage engine failure T+122 seconds. Suspected collision with the first stage following separation.			
6 July 1966; 12:57	UR-500 8K82	UR500-212	Site 81/23	Successful
6 July 1966; 12:57	Proton 3 (N-4 #4)	Low Earth		Particle research
6 July 1966; 12:57	Final flight of UR-500 8K82			
=== 1967 ===
10 March 1967; 11:30	UR-500K/D 8K82K/11S824	107227-01	Site 81/23	Successful
10 March 1967; 11:30	Kosmos 146 (Soyuz 7K-L1 #2P)	Highly elliptical		Spacecraft test
10 March 1967; 11:30	Maiden flight of UR-500K 8K82K (later Proton-K), first Proton launch with an upper stage			
8 April 1967; 09:00	Proton-K/D 8K82K/11S824	228-01	Site 81/23	Failure
8 April 1967; 09:00	Kosmos 154 (Soyuz 7K-L1 #3P)	Highly elliptical (intended); Low Earth (achieved)		Spacecraft test
8 April 1967; 09:00	Premature separation of fourth stage ullage motors			
27 September 1967; 22:11	Proton-K/D 8K82K/11S824	229-01	Site 81/23	Failure
27 September 1967; 22:11	Soyuz 7K-L1 #4L	Highly elliptical (intended)		Spacecraft test
27 September 1967; 22:11	#1 first stage engine failed to start at liftoff due to a loose plug. Automatic shutdown commanded at T+97 seconds. The LES pulled the L1 descent module to safety.			
22 November 1967; 19:07	Proton-K/D 8K82K/11S824	230-01	Site 81/24	Failure
22 November 1967; 19:07	Soyuz 7K-L1 #5L	Highly elliptical (intended)		Spacecraft test
22 November 1967; 19:07	First launch from Site 81/24. Second stage engine failure due to improper start sequence. Automatic shutdown commanded at T+125 seconds. The LES pulled the L1 descent module to safety.			
=== 1968 ===
2 March 1968; 22:11	Proton-K/D 8K82K/11S824	231-01	Site 81/23	Successful
2 March 1968; 22:11	Zond 4 (Soyuz 7K-L1 #6L)	Highly elliptical		Spacecraft test
2 March 1968; 22:11	Spacecraft later failed			
22 April 1968; 23:01	Proton-K/D 8K82K/11S824	232-01	Site 81/24	Failure
22 April 1968; 23:01	Soyuz 7K-L1 #7L	Highly elliptical (intended)		Spacecraft test
22 April 1968; 23:01	LES malfunction trigged an unintended second stage shutdown. Spacecraft descent module successfully recovered.			
14 September 1968; 21:42	Proton-K/D 8K82K/11S824	234-01	Site 81/23	Successful
14 September 1968; 21:42	Zond 5 (Soyuz 7K-L1 #9L)	Highly elliptical		Spacecraft test
10 November 1968; 19:11	Proton-K/D 8K82K/11S824	235-01	Site 81/23	Successful
10 November 1968; 19:11	Zond 6 (Soyuz 7K-L1 #12L)	Highly elliptical		Spacecraft test
10 November 1968; 19:11	Spacecraft later failed			
16 November 1968; 11:40	Proton-K/D 8K82K/11S824	236-01	Site 81/24	Successful
16 November 1968; 11:40	Proton 4 (N-6 #1)	Low Earth		Cosmic ray research
16 November 1968; 11:40	First Proton-K launch without an upper stage			
=== 1969 ===
20 January 1969; 04:14	Proton-K/D 8K82K/11S824	237-01	Site 81/23	Failure
20 January 1969; 04:14	Soyuz 7K-L1 #13L	Highly elliptical (intended)		Spacecraft test
20 January 1969; 04:14	#3 second stage engine failed due to rotor imbalance. The other three engines managed to complete second stage burn successfully, but the third stage then failed due to a propellant feed malfunction. The spacecraft was detached and successfully recovered.			
19 February 1969; 06:48	Proton-K/D 8K82K/11S824	239-01	Site 81/24	Failure
19 February 1969; 06:48	Luna E-8 #201	Highly elliptical (intended)		Lunar lander
19 February 1969; 06:48	Payload fairing broke up T+51 seconds. First stage exploded after flying debris ruptured the propellant tanks. Spacecraft was to have deployed a Lunokhod rover			
27 March 1969; 10:40	Proton-K/D 8K82K/11S824	240-01	Site 81/23	Failure
27 March 1969; 10:40	Mars-2M #521	Heliocentric (intended)		Mars orbiter
27 March 1969; 10:40	Third stage engine failure due to rotor imbalance.			
2 April 1969; 10:33	Proton-K/D 8K82K/11S824	233-01	Site 81/24	Failure
2 April 1969; 10:33	Mars-2M #522	Heliocentric (intended)		Mars orbiter
2 April 1969; 10:33	Missing drain plug caused a first stage engine failure and thrust section fire at liftoff. Booster impacted the ground 40 seconds after launch.			
14 June 1969; 04:00	Proton-K/D 8K82K/11S824	238-01	Site 81/24	Failure
14 June 1969; 04:00	Luna E-8-5 #402	Highly elliptical (intended)		Lunar sample return
14 June 1969; 04:00	Blok D ignition failure			
13 July 1969; 02:54	Proton-K/D 8K82K/11S824	242-01	Site 81/24	Successful
13 July 1969; 02:54	Luna 15 (Luna E-8-5 #401)	Highly elliptical		Lunar sample return
13 July 1969; 02:54	Spacecraft later failed			
7 August 1969; 23:48	Proton-K/D 8K82K/11S824	243-01	Site 81/23	Successful
7 August 1969; 23:48	Zond 7 (Soyuz 7K-L1 #11)	Highly elliptical		Spacecraft test
23 September 1969; 14:07	Proton-K/D 8K82K/11S824	244-01	Site 81/24	Failure
23 September 1969; 14:07	Kosmos 300 (Luna E-8-5 #403)	Highly elliptical (intended); Low Earth (achieved)		Lunar sample return
23 September 1969; 14:07	Blok D failure due to defective LOX valve			
22 October 1969; 14:09	Proton-K/D 8K82K/11S824	241-01	Site 81/24	Failure
22 October 1969; 14:09	Kosmos 305 (Luna E-8-5 #404)	Highly elliptical (intended); Low Earth (achieved)		Lunar sample return
22 October 1969; 14:09	Upper control system malfunctioned			
28 November 1969; 09:00	Proton-K/D 8K82K/11S824	245-01	Site 81/23	Failure
28 November 1969; 09:00	Soyuz 7K-L1E #1	Medium Earth (intended)		Test flight
28 November 1969; 09:00	Third stage engine failure T+556 seconds due to resonant vibration causing the rupture of a propellant feed line.			
