= Zond =

Zond may refer to

- Zond program, Soviet uncrewed space program undertaken from 1964 to 1970
  - Zond 1, spacecraft
  - Zond 2, spacecraft
  - Zond 3, spacecraft
  - Zond 4, spacecraft
  - Zond 5, spacecraft
  - Zond 3MV-1 No.2, spacecraft
  - Zond 7, spacecraft
  - Zond 8, spacecraft
  - Zond 1964A, spacecraft
  - Zond 1967A, spacecraft
  - Zond 1967B, spacecraft
- Zond Corporation, wind turbine developer
- "Zond", a song from the 2015 album Man It Feels Like Space Again by the Australian band Pond
