= Kosmos 154 =

Failed Soviet orbital test flight (Zond)

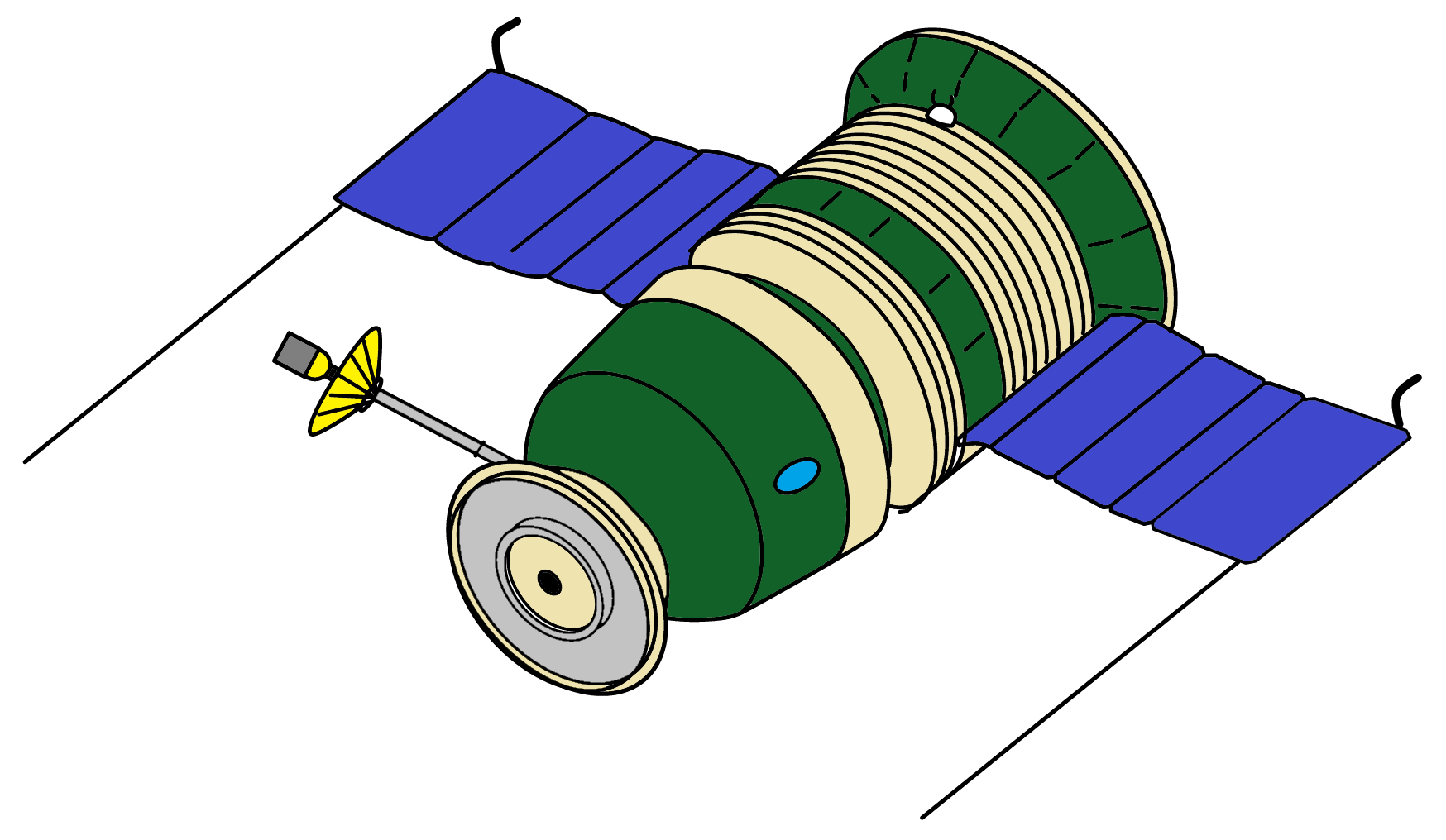
- A color drawing of a Zond L1 spacecraft
- Mission type: Orbital test flight Lunar flyby (failed)
- Operator: Soviet space program
- COSPAR ID: 1967-032A
- SATCAT no.: 2745
- Mission duration: 2 days

Spacecraft properties
- Spacecraft: Zond L1P No.3
- Spacecraft type: Soyuz 7K-L1P
- Manufacturer: OKB-1
- Launch mass: 5375 kg

Start of mission
- Launch date: 8 April 1967, 09:07:00 GMT
- Rocket: Proton-K/D
- Launch site: Baikonur 81/23
- Contractor: OKB-1

End of mission
- Disposal: Launch failure
- Decay date: 10 April 1967

Orbital parameters
- Reference system: Geocentric
- Regime: Highly elliptical Earth
- Periapsis altitude: 183 km
- Apoapsis altitude: 223 km
- Inclination: 51.6°
- Period: 88.5 minutes
- Epoch: 8 April 1967

Kosmos 154 (Russian: Космос 154 meaning Cosmos 154), also known as Zond No.3P, was a Soviet test spacecraft launched from the Baikonur aboard a Proton-K rocket. It was a prototype Soyuz 7K-L1 launched by Proton. It was an uncrewed precursor to the Zond series.

== History ==
The spacecraft was designed to launch a crew from the Earth to conduct a flyby of the Moon and return to Earth. The primary focus was a circumlunar flight, to help document the Moon. The test ran from the Zond program from 1967-1970, which produced multiple failures in the 7K-L1's re-entry systems. The remaining 7K-L1s were scrapped, ultimately replaced by the Soyuz 7K-L3.

== Objectives ==
Two test flights of the UR-500K/L1 system were performed in March and April 1967 under the designations Kosmos 146 and Kosmos 154. In April 1967, under the cover name Kosmos-154, the third model of the L-1 was placed into near-Earth orbit. Because of a control system failure that resulted in the premature jettisoning of the ullage motors, the main propulsion system of the Block-D did not ignite. Kosmos 154 was one of the first Zond attempts. It was supposed to flyby the Moon but achieved Earth orbit only.

== Mission ==
Kosmos 154 was launched using a Proton-K carrier rocket, which flew from Site 81/23 at Baikonur. The launch occurred at 09:07 GMT on 8 April 1967. Kosmos 154 was operated in an Earth orbit, it had a perigee of 183 kilometres (114 mi), an apogee of 223 kilometres (139 mi), an inclination of 51.6° and an orbital period of 88.5 minutes. Kosmos 154 had a mass of 5,375 kilograms (11,850 lb).

Kosmos 154 reached Earth orbit but the Blok D translunar injection stage failed to fire (ullage rockets, which had to fire to settle propellants in tanks before the main engine fired, were jettisoned prematurely). Kosmos 154 burned up two days later when orbit decayed, on 10 April 1967.
