= Soyuz 7K-L1 No.5L =

Failed 1967 Soviet test spaceflight

- A Soyuz 7K-L1 spacecraft
- Mission type: Lunar flyby Spacecraft test
- Mission duration: Failed to orbit

Spacecraft properties
- Spacecraft type: Soyuz 7K-L1
- Manufacturer: OKB-1
- Launch mass: 5,390 kilograms (11,880 lb)

Start of mission
- Launch date: 22 November 1967, 19:07:59 UTC
- Rocket: Proton-K/D s/n 230-01
- Launch site: Baikonur 81/24

Soyuz 7K-L1 No.5L, sometimes identified by NASA as Zond 1967B, was a Soviet spacecraft which was launched in 1967 as part of the Zond programme. It was a 5,390-kilogram (11,880 lb) Soyuz 7K-L1 spacecraft, the second of nine to be launched. It was intended to perform a circumlunar flyby of the Moon before returning to the Earth for landing, but failed to achieve Earth orbit.

Soyuz 7K-L1 No.5L was launched at 19:07:59 UTC on 22 November 1967 atop a Proton-K 8K78K carrier rocket with a Blok D upper stage, flying from Site 81/24 at the Baikonur Cosmodrome. After an apparently normal first stage burn, second stage separation and engine start began two minutes into launch. A malfunction occurred within moments and the Launch Escape System could be seen activating. A recovery effort to locate the descent module was immediately initiated. The descent module landed 285 kilometres (177 mi) downrange. Its landing motors fired prematurely, resulting in a harder landing than expected, and the spacecraft was subsequently dragged 550 metres (1,800 ft) by its parachute. It was subsequently collected by a Mil Mi-4 helicopter. Recovery of the descent module was impeded by the chilly late November weather at the landing site. Initial examination of telemetry data from the launch had found that the Proton second stage failed to reach full thrust and that the AVD malfunction system had sent a cutoff signal and activated the LES at T+129 seconds. Recovery of booster debris and further examination of telemetry determined that an improper start sequence resulted in low thrust in engines 2 and 3, while the No. 4 engine thrust chamber ruptured from unstable combustion. The second stage began tumbling, which the AVD sensed and terminated thrust. Additionally, the Proton first stage experienced a problem with the propellant feed system resulting in lower than normal thrust, although it had performed its burn successfully. Prior to the release of information about its mission, NASA correctly identified that it had been a test of a spacecraft intended for crewed lunar flights. However, they were unsure whether it was intended to reach the Moon itself.
