= Soyuz 7K-L1 No.4L =

Failed 1967 Soviet test spaceflight

- A Soyuz 7K-L1 spacecraft
- Mission type: Lunar flyby Spacecraft test
- Mission duration: Failed to orbit

Spacecraft properties
- Spacecraft type: Soyuz 7K-L1
- Manufacturer: OKB-1
- Launch mass: 5,390 kilograms (11,880 lb)

Start of mission
- Launch date: 27 September 1967, 22:11:54 UTC
- Rocket: Proton-K/D s/n 229-01
- Launch site: Baikonur 81/23

Soyuz 7K-L1 No.4L, sometimes identified by NASA as Zond 1967A, was a Soviet spacecraft which was launched in 1967 as part of the Zond programme. It was a 5,390-kilogram (11,880 lb) Soyuz 7K-L1 spacecraft, the first of nine to be launched. Although it was intended to perform a circumlunar flyby of the Moon before returning to the Earth for landing, it failed to achieve Earth orbit.

Soyuz 7K-L1 No.4L was launched at 22:11:54 UTC on 27 September 1967 atop a Proton-K 8K78K carrier rocket with a Blok D upper stage, flying from Site 81/23 at the Baikonur Cosmodrome. A rubber plug came loose and lodged in some plumbing at liftoff, causing one first stage engine to shut off. The booster eventually lost attitude control and became unstable during flight, so the automatic shutdown command was sent at T+97 seconds and it crashed downrange. The spacecraft separated from the rocket by means of the SAS launch escape system, and came down between 50 and 60 kilometres (31 and 37 mi) downrange. The next morning, recovery crews located the descent module, however approaching it was tricky due to spilled propellant and still-burning booster debris in the area. It was collected by a Mil Mi-6 helicopter and returned to Baikonur. Prior to the release of information about its mission, NASA correctly identified that it had been a test of a spacecraft intended for crewed Lunar flights. However, they were unsure whether it was intended to reach the Moon itself.
