= Zond 5 =

First lunar mission to carry animals

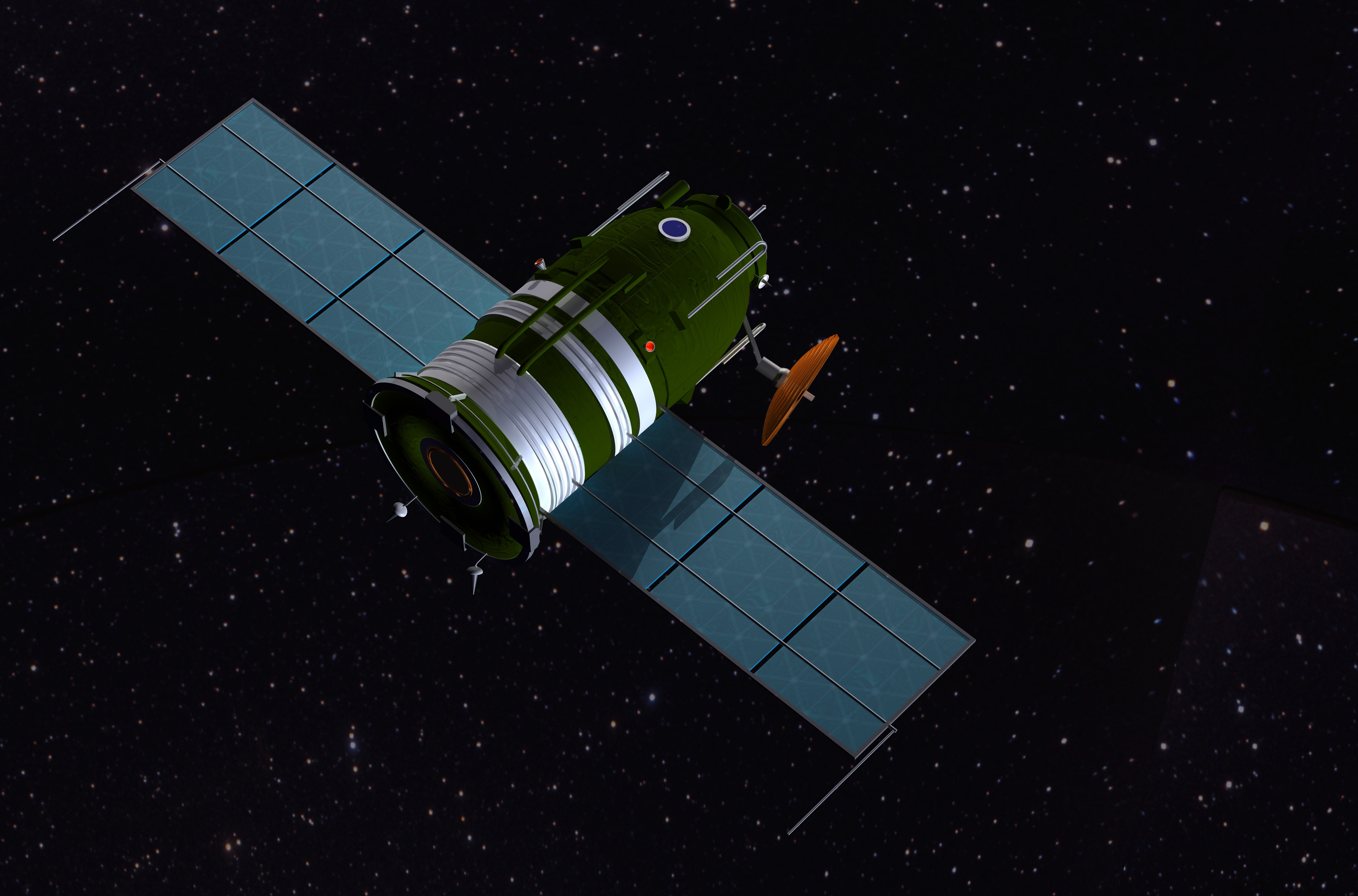
- Computer model of a Zond circumlunar spacecraft
- Names: Soyuz 7K-L1 s/n 9
- Mission type: Lunar flyby; Spacecraft test
- Operator: OKB-1
- COSPAR ID: 1968-076A
- SATCAT no.: 3394
- Mission duration: 6 days, 18 hours, 24 minutes

Spacecraft properties
- Bus: Soyuz 7K-L1
- Manufacturer: OKB-1
- Launch mass: 5,375 kilograms (11,850 lb)

Start of mission
- Launch date: 14 September 1968, 21:42:11 UTC
- Rocket: Proton-K/D
- Launch site: Baikonur 81

End of mission
- Recovered by: Soviet vessels Borovichy and Vasiliy Golovin
- Landing date: 21 September 1968 16:08 UT
- Landing site: 32°38′S 65°33′E; In the Indian Ocean

Orbital parameters
- Reference system: Geocentric
- Regime: Low Earth
- Semi-major axis: 6,613 kilometres (4,109 mi)
- Eccentricity: 0.00604
- Perigee altitude: 202 kilometres (126 mi)
- Apogee altitude: 282 kilometres (175 mi)
- Inclination: 51.83°
- Period: 89.29 minutes
- Epoch: 13 September 1968

Flyby of Moon
- Closest approach: 18 September 1968
- Distance: 1,950 km (1,210 mi)

Zond 5 (Russian: Зонд 5, lit. 'Probe 5') was a spacecraft of the Soviet Zond program. In September 1968 Zond 5 travelled around the Moon in a circumlunar trajectory and became the first Moon mission to include animals and the first to return safely to Earth. The first terrestrial organisms to fly to the vicinity of the Moon, and beyond low Earth orbit, included two Russian tortoises, fruit fly eggs, and plants.

The tortoises underwent biological changes during the flight, but it was concluded that the changes were primarily due to starvation and that they were little affected by space travel.

The Zond spacecraft was a version of the Soyuz 7K-L1 crewed lunar-flyby spacecraft. It was launched by a Proton-K carrier rocket with a Block D upper-stage to conduct scientific studies during its lunar flyby.

== Background ==
Out of the first four circumlunar missions launched by the Soviet Union there was one partial success, Zond 4, and three failures. After Zond 4's mission in March 1968, a follow-up, Zond 1968A, was launched on 23 April. The launch failed when an erroneous abort command shut down the Proton rocket's second stage. The escape rocket fired and pulled the descent module to safety. In July, Zond 1968B was being prepared for launch when the Block D second-stage rocket exploded on the launchpad, killing three people, but leaving the Proton first-stage booster rocket and the spacecraft itself with only minor damage.

The Zond 5 mission was originally planned to fly cosmonauts around the Moon, but the failures of Zond 1968A and Zond 1968B led the Soviets, fearing the negative propaganda of an unsuccessful crewed flight, to send two tortoises instead.

== Payload ==
The two Russian tortoises (Agrionemys horsfieldii) included in the biological payload weighed 0.34–0.4 kilograms (0.75–0.88 lb) each, pre-flight. Along with the tortoises, insect eggs and micro-organisms were part of the payload. Soviet scientists chose tortoises since they were easy to tightly secure. There were also two tortoises used as control specimens back on Earth, and four more in a vivarium. Twelve days before launch, the two space-bound tortoises were secured in the vehicle and deprived of food and water; the control tortoises were similarly deprived. The food deprivation was a part of pathomorphological and histochemical experiments. The biological payload also included fruit fly eggs; cells of wheat, barley, pea, pine, carrots and tomatoes; specimens of the wildflower species Tradescantia paludosa; three strains of the single-celled green algae Chlorella; and one strain of lysogenic bacteria. The purpose of sending a variety of terrestrial lifeforms was to test the effect of cosmic radiation on them. However, the test subjects were not analogous to humans, because the choice of life forms were all extremophiles with a substantially higher radioresistance. The Russian Academy of Sciences stated that a mannequin equipped with radiation sensors occupied the pilot's seat.

Kazan Optical and Mechanical Plant had developed the AFA-BA/40 imager, which was installed on the spacecraft, giving it the ability to image the Earth. Zond 5 also contained proton detectors. Zond 5 could transmit some of its data back to ground stations, although data stored onboard and collected after return to Earth has less noise.

== Mission ==
=== Launch and trajectory ===
Zond 5 launched on 14 September 1968 at 21:42.10 UTC, from Site 81 at the Baikonur Cosmodrome. The thrust of the third-stage rocket was terminated at 160 kilometres (99 mi), which was the start of a 251-second coast. Block D, the upper-stage rocket, ignited and burned for 108 seconds, placing the spacecraft into a parking orbit of 191 by 219 kilometres (119 mi × 136 mi). Fifty-six minutes into the parking orbit the Block D fired a final time for the trans-lunar injection. After this maneuver, the launch was announced to the world. Mission Control discovered a problem with Zond 5's attitude and traced the cause to a contaminated star tracker. Heat caused some of the interior coating to outgas, which delayed an attitude correction on the way toward the Moon. The maneuver was performed 325,000 kilometres (202,000 mi) from Earth using the Sun and the Earth as reference points.

On 18 September, the spacecraft flew around the Moon, although it did not orbit it. The closest distance was 1,950 kilometres (1,210 mi). On the way back from the Moon, another star tracker failed. The spacecraft also erroneously switched off the guided reentry system. Eight ships were deployed to the Indian Ocean prior to launch, as a precaution in case the spacecraft could not reach Soviet territory; only three of them had rescue helicopters on board.

=== Reentry and recovery ===
Zond 5's splashdown location

On 21 September, the reentry capsule entered the Earth's atmosphere. The primary landing zone was in Kazakhstan, but instead Zond 5 splashed down in the Indian Ocean and was recovered by the Soviet vessels Borovichy (Боровичи) and Vasiliy Golovnin (Василий Головнин). It landed at 32°38′S 65°33′E, 105 kilometres (65 mi) from the nearest Soviet naval ship. The landing occurred at night, which impaired recovery efforts.

Zond 5 became the first spacecraft to circle the Moon and return to Earth. The entire journey took 6 days, 18 hours and 24 minutes. The biological specimens were safely recovered. USS McMorris shadowed the Soviet recovery ships, collecting intelligence, but left shortly after the spacecraft was brought on board the Soviet ship.

== Results and future plans ==
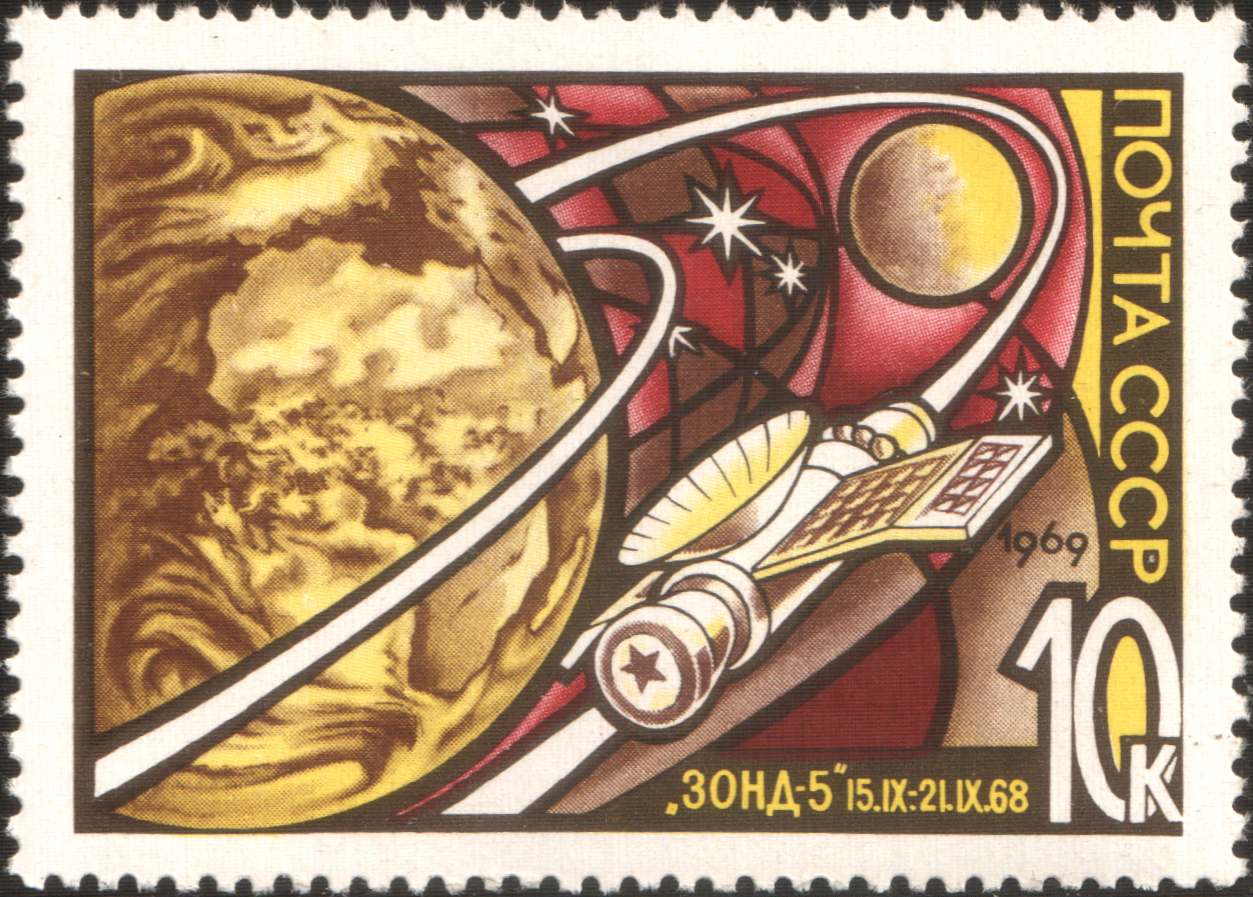
1969 USSR stamp of Zond 5

High-quality photographs of the Earth, the first photos of their kind, were taken at a distance of 90,000 kilometres (56,000 mi). British astronomer Bernard Lovell, considered to be Britain's top space expert, said that the Zond 5 mission showed that the Soviets were ahead in the Space Race. The British Interplanetary Society believed that the USSR would be able to send cosmonauts around the Moon within a matter of months.

In October 1968, sources in the U.S. claimed the mission was not as successful as the Soviets advertised. The mission had been intended to fly closer to the Moon, and its actual distance did not allow for useful lunar photography. They also said that the angle at which the spacecraft reentered the atmosphere was too steep for a cosmonaut to survive. The sources indicated that the spacecraft landed in the Indian Ocean when the planned location was in Soviet territory, which was a factor in the recovery taking ten hours.

The official Soviet news agency, TASS, announced in November 1968 that the flight carried living animals. The tortoises were dissected on 11 October after fasting for 39 days. The flying tortoises, identified as No. 22 and No. 37, had lost 10% of their body weight during the trip, but showed no loss of appetite. The control tortoises lost 5% of their weight. Comparison of analyses of blood from the space-travelling tortoises and the control specimens revealed no differences. Another analysis showed the flying tortoises had elevated iron and glycogen levels in their liver and that the flight also affected the internal structures of their spleens. The authors concluded that the changes in the flight tortoises were primarily due to starvation, with the space travel having little effect. In November 1968, it was announced that the spacecraft was planned as a precursor to a crewed lunar spacecraft. The Soviets made this announcement a month before the planned Apollo 8 flight, in an attempt to show they were close to being able to carry out a crewed trip to the Moon.

== Cosmonaut crew communications test and hoax ==
The Zond 5 caused a scare in the United States when on 19 September 1968, the voices of cosmonauts Valery Bykovsky, Vitaly Sevastyanov and Pavel Popovich were transmitted from the spacecraft and intercepted by Jodrell Bank Observatory and the CIA. The cosmonauts were apparently reading out telemetry data and computer readings, and even discussing making an attempt to land. At the height of the Cold War, there was a real concern that the Soviets might actually beat NASA to the Moon. Apollo 17 astronaut Eugene Cernan remarked that the incident had "shocked the hell out of us."

Popovich would later recall: "When we realized we would never make it to the moon, we decided to engage in a little bit of hooliganism. We asked our engineers to link the on-the-probe receiver to the transmitter with a jumper wire. Moon flight missions were then controlled from a command centre in Yevpatoria, in the Crimea. When the probe was on its path round the Moon, I was at the center. So I took the mic and said: 'The flight is proceeding according to normal; we’re approaching the surface ...'. Seconds later my report – as if from outer space – was received on Earth, including [by] the Americans. The U.S. space advisor Frank Borman got a phone call from President Nixon [actually Johnson], who asked: 'Why is Popovich reporting from the moon?' My joke caused real turmoil. In about a month's time. Frank came to the USSR, and I was instructed to meet him at the airport. Hardly had he walked out of his plane when he shook his fist at me and said: 'Hey, you, space hooligan!'"

== Location ==
The Zond 5 capsule is on display at the RKK Energiya museum, located in Moscow Oblast, Russia.

== See also ==
- Animals in space
- Zond 6, turtles on a circumlunar mission in November 1968
- Zond 7, four turtles flew the August 1969 circumlunar flight
- Fee, Fi, Fo, Fum, and Phooey, five mice who orbited the Moon a record 75 times in December 1972, while traveling on NASA's Apollo 17 mission
- List of missions to the Moon
- Korabl-Sputnik 5, another Soviet mission some mistakenly thought was crewed.
