= Soviet lunar exploration program =

Soviet lunar exploration program may refer to:

- Soviet crewed lunar programs
- Luna programme
- Lunokhod programme
- Zond program
