= Ullage =

Unfilled space in a container, particularly with a liquid

Ullage or headspace is the unfilled space in a container, particularly in a container for liquids.

== Etymology ==
The word ullage comes from the Latin word oculus, used by the Romans to refer to a barrel cork hole. This word was, in turn, taken in medieval French as oeil, from which a verb ouiller was created, meaning to fill a barrel to full capacity. Around 1300, the word ouillage was created by the Normans to refer to the amount of liquid needed to fill a barrel to capacity.

== Alcoholic beverages ==
In winemaking, ullage came to refer to any amount by which a barrel is unfilled, perhaps because some of the contents have been used. It is also applied to the unfilled air space at the top of a bottle of wine, which in this case is essential to allow for expansion of the contents as the temperature changes.

By further extension, in brewing and beer retail, ullage is the residue of beer left in a barrel that has been emptied. When calculating tax returns and the like, licensed premises owners, landlords or managers can factor in the duty on ullage, or unavoidable barrel wastage. Ullage therefore has come to be used as a general term, in the licensed trade, for waste beer whether at the barrel or at the bar tap or pump. However, what customers leave in their glasses does not count as ullage, because it has been sold.

== Rocketry ==
Three sets of ullage motors are shown in this schematic of the Saturn V rocket.

Liquid propellant rockets and spacecraft store their propellants in tanks. Cryogenic tanks are never completely filled, to prevent severe pressure drop in the tank after engine start. On the ground, or in the continued gravitational field of Earth during rocket-propelled ascent, the space between the top of the propellant load and the top of the tank is known as "ullage space". Ullage pressure is a critical measurable during powered rocket flight, because it affects tank structural integrity and engine net positive suction head (NPSH).

In the weightless condition in space without engine thrust, empty space occurs in partially-filled tanks, and the ullage space becomes distributed across much of the tank in a heterogeneous mixture of masses of liquid amidst many gaseous regions. Under these conditions, liquid floats away from the engine intake, which is undesirable for stable engine operation.

The application of a small force, from a small rocket engine for example, is sometimes used to provide sufficient acceleration to reaggregate (settle) the liquid propellant at the bottom of the tank near the engine propellant inlet prior to ignition of the main engine(s). Engines devoted to this single purpose are typically called ullage motors.

Reaction control system thrusters are also often used to settle propellants prior to reignition of a liquid propellant engine in space.

== Industrial use ==
Ullage is also widely used in industrial or marine settings to describe the empty space in large tanks or holds used to store or carry liquids or bulk solids such as grain. In accordance with IMO regulations, the Code of Federal Regulations, and the ABS Rules for Steel Vessels, certain pressurized tanks on steel ships may not be filled greater than 98% full, although there are exceptions. This is so that the pressure relief valve is always in contact with a gas or vapor. Certain pressure relief valves for chemical use are not designed to relieve the pressure when in contact with liquids.

In some cases, the ullage in a ship's hold can be relevant to stability; Liquid or dry bulk cargo in a part-filled hold can shift asymmetrically towards one side as the ship heels to one side and the other, reducing the margin of stability when compared with a full hold. Excessive ullage in a tank may contribute to the free surface effect. When referring to the free surface effect, the condition of a tank that is not full is described as a "slack tank", while a full tank is "pressed up".

== Bibliography ==
- ABS Rules for Steel Vessels 2007, Part 5C
