= Zond failed missions =

Soviet robotic spacecraft program

Zond program (Зонд; Russian for "probe") was a Soviet robotic spacecraft program launched between 1964 and 1970, using two spacecraft series, one for interplanetary exploration, and the other for lunar exploration.

== Program details ==
The program had two series of spacecraft. The first series, based on the 3MV planetary probe, was intended to gather information about nearby planets. The second series of test spacecraft was intended as a precursor to crewed circumlunar loop flights, using a stripped-down variant of Soyuz spacecraft, consisting of the service and descent modules, but lacking the orbital module.

The Government of the Soviet Union had suppressed failed Space Race mission information to prevent bad publicity during the height of the Cold War and the Space Race. Since the fall of the Soviet Union in 1991, much previously restricted information became available.

== Zond 1964A ==
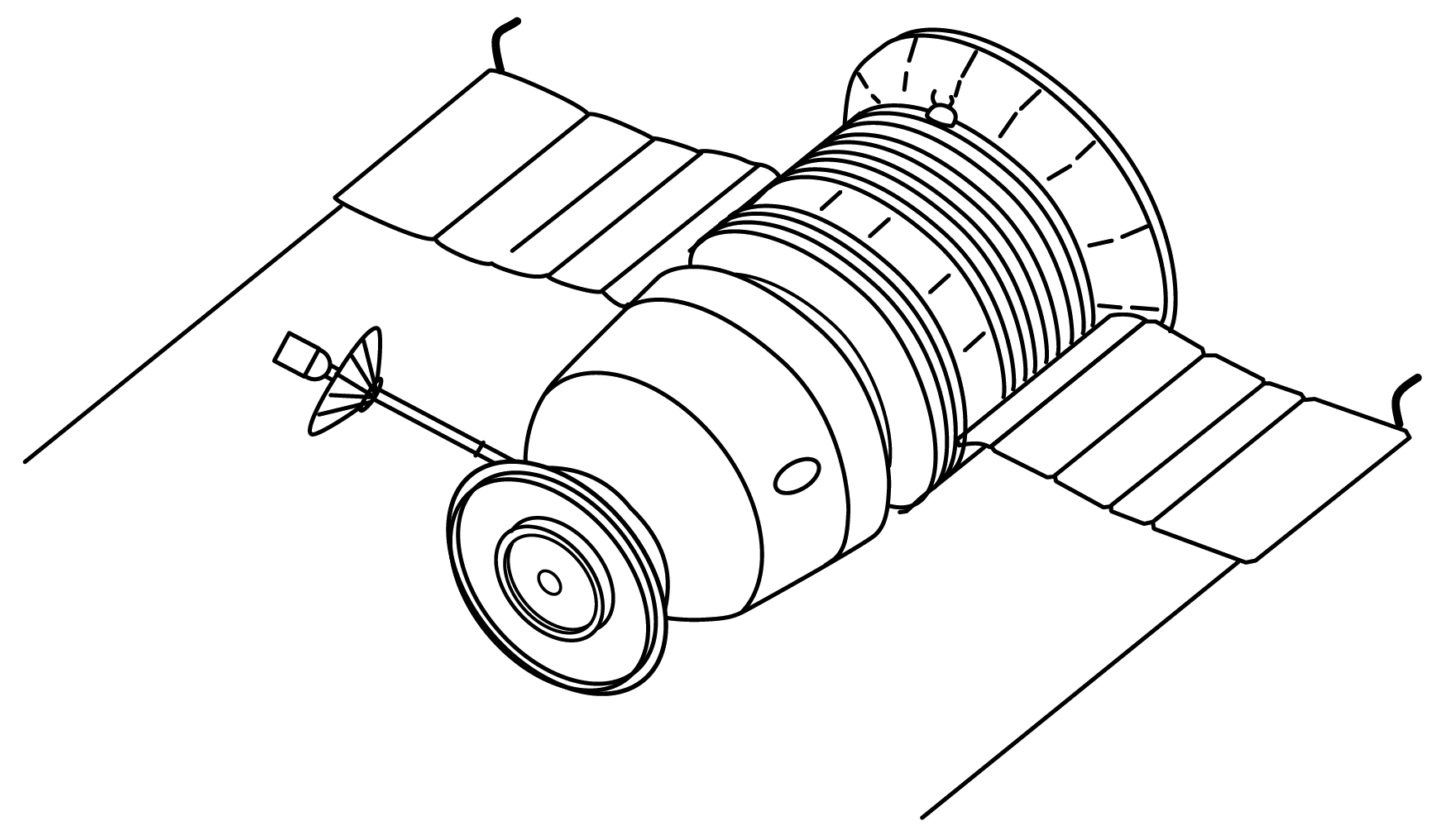
Drawings for the Zond L1 circumlunar spacecraft

Zond 1964A, a SL-6/A-2-e launch vehicle, launched on 4 June 1964, but failed to achieve Earth orbit. The problem was found to be a faulty valve, that failed 104 seconds after launch. The payload was Molniya-1 No.2, a Soviet communications satellite.

== Zond 1967A ==
Zond 1967A was launched on 28 September 1967. The Soyuz 7K-L1 No.4L s/n 4 craft was 5,200 kg. Sixty seconds after launch the rocket veered off course. The escape tower took the Zond capsule safely away from the falling rocket. The rocket crashed 65 km downrange and ended the attempted Lunar flyby. The SL-12/D-1-e Proton launcher first stage had six engines. It was found that a fuel line of one engine was blocked by a rubber plug which had come loose. Had the mission been successful this would have been designated Zond 4.

== Zond 1967B ==
Zond 1967B launched on 22 November 1967 in an attempted lunar flyby mission. The Soyuz 7K-L1 No.5L craft was 5,200 kg. A second stage failure occurred and the launch vehicle crashed 300 km downrange. The automatic system shut down the other engines. The Zond capsule separated with the escape tower and was safely recovered. Had the mission been successful this would also have been designated Zond 4.

== Zond 1968A ==
Zond 1968A was launched on 23 April 1968. The Zond was on a Soyuz 7K-L1 s/n 7L. The craft was 5,600kg. The Proton K rocket performed apparently normally until T+260 seconds when second stage thrust abruptly terminated. The Launch Escape System pulled the descent module away. Examination found that the gyroscope package in the descent module was installed improperly, causing spurious electrical signals to travel down the stack. This resulted in malfunctions of the Proton's telemetry and guidance systems. A voltage external to the rocket was detected from 86 seconds, at which point the guidance computer reset itself, and until descent module separation. There had been anomalies with the telemetry and guidance from liftoff, suggesting the problem began early in the launch. Eventually the voltage level to the guidance system dropped too low to maintain proper operation and the SBS malfunction detection system aborted the launch at 260 seconds.

== Zond 1968B ==
Zond 1968B was planned to be launched on 21 July 1968 on a Soyuz 7K-L1 s/n 8L. On 14 July, while preparing for launch, the Blok D fourth state LOX tank exploded. The pad explosion killed three workers. The spacecraft and LES were left suspended above the booster, held in place only by the gantry structure. Below it was the still intact and full Blok D RP-1 tank and below that the Proton vehicle, which was pressurized, but unfueled. An intricate operation had to be carried out to extract the spacecraft, drain all fluids from it, disable all pyrotechnic devices, drain the Blok D fuel tank, and remove the LES tower. Extremely hot midsummer weather created the possibility of some fluids in the spacecraft exploding. While many of the fluids were successfully drained, the spacecraft propulsion system's main tanks could not be drained and only some of the fluid from the coolant system was. The operation took about a month of work, but was completed successfully. The Proton could then be taken down from the pad. The third stage sustained some damage and had to be replaced, but the spacecraft was intact and could be refurbished for another launch attempt. Investigation into the mishap found that improperly grounded cabling at the launch site had caused spurious voltages. An inadvertent command was sent to pressurize the Blok D LOX tank until it ruptured from overpressure. The Proton first-stage booster rocket and the Zond spacecraft had only minor damage. Had the mission been successful this would have been designated Zond 7.

== Zond 1969A ==
Zond 1969A was launched on 20 January 1969, a Soyuz 7K-L1 s/n 13, was to be a lunar flyby and return to Earth with pictures. The launch was normal until T+313 seconds when engine no. 4 on the second stage shut down prematurely. General Kamanin initially believed the third stage could have burned long enough to compensate and gotten the spacecraft to orbit if the SBS system had not terminated the flight, but examination of flight data found that there had been both second and third stage engine malfunctions. The second stage malfunction was due to a rotor imbalance in the no. 4 engine fuel turbopump, which caused its failure. The remaining three engines continued to operate normally and the stage finished its burn at 338 seconds. During third stage operation, the fuel feed line to the gas generator ruptured, causing loss of thrust at 500 seconds. The small vernier engines continued operating until the planned cutoff at 595 seconds but were insufficient to attain orbital velocity and the Launch Escape System activated at T+608 seconds. The descent module touched down near the Mongolian border. Had the mission been successful this would have been designated as Zond 7. The craft was 5,600 kg.

== Zond L1S-1 ==
Zond L1S-1 failed on 21 February 1969, this was the first launch of the N-1 rocket, a super heavy-lift launch vehicle built to send a crewed Soviet spacecraft to the Moon, like the United States Apollo program. Pyrotechnics and propellant leaks led to electrical interference in the KORD avionics system. At 68.7 seconds into flight these electrical failures caused the KORD system to shut down all 28 remaining engines.

== Zond L1S-2 ==
The Zond L1S-2 (Zond-M 2) mission was to be the second test of the N-1 rocket engine, moded SL-15/N-1. Zond L1S-1, the first test N-1 rocket, had failed on 21 February 1969. L1S-2 - Zond-M 2 had a Zond capsule with Moon landing site cameras and a test Soviet Moon lander. L1S-2 goal was to put the lander into lunar orbit. Zond L1S-2 launched on 3 July 1969 at 23:18:32 Moscow time. A few seconds after liftoff, with the rocket at an altitude of about 180 meters, the main engines shut down. The rocket crashed back onto the launchpad and exploded 18 seconds after liftoff. The massive explosion destroyed Pad 110 East (110/38) at the Baikonur Cosmodrome. The Zond escape tower fired and the capsule landed clear of the launchpad, about 1 km away. It was determined that engine 8's oxygen pump had failed and exploded. The explosion damaged the engine, which started an automatic shutdown of all the other engines.

Two more subsequent tests of the N1 rocket failed: Soyuz 7K-L1E No.1 and Soyuz 7K-LOK No.1. With these four failures, the N-1 crewed lunar program was canceled. NASA used the Saturn V rocket for lunar missions, a super heavy-lift rocket like the N-1.

Flight number	Date (UTC)	Launch site	Serial no.	Payload	Outcome	Remarks
1	21 February 1969; 09:18:07	Baikonur, Site 110/38	3L	Zond L1S-1	Failure	
2	3 July 1969; 20:18:32	Baikonur, Site 110/38	5L	Zond L1S-2	Failure	Destroyed launch pad 110 East
3	26 June 1971; 23:15:08	Baikonur, Site 110/37	6L	Soyuz 7K-L1E No.1	Failure	
4	23 November 1972; 06:11:55	Baikonur, Site 110/37	7L	Soyuz 7K-LOK No.1	Failure	

== Cosmos 154 ==
- Cosmos 154 failed to go into the planned translunar trajectory. The craft was 5,600 kg. Cosmos 154 was one of the first Zond attempts.

== Zond 3MV-1 No.2 ==
Zond 3MV-1 No.2 launched on 19 February 1964, exploded on the pad.

== See also ==
- List of unmanned aerial vehicles
- Timeline of Solar System exploration
- Moon landing
