= Zond 7 =

1969 Soviet test spaceflight to the Moon

- Zond 7
- Names: Soyuz 7K-L1 s/n 11
- Mission type: Lunar flyby Spacecraft test
- Operator: OKB-1
- COSPAR ID: 1969-067A
- SATCAT no.: 04062
- Mission duration: 6 days, 18 hours, & 25 minutes

Spacecraft properties
- Bus: Soyuz 7K-L1
- Manufacturer: OKB-1
- Launch mass: 5,375 kilograms (11,850 lb)

Start of mission
- Launch date: August 7, 1969, 23:48:06 UTC
- Rocket: Proton-K D
- Launch site: Baikonur 81/23

End of mission
- Disposal: Soft landing and recovery
- Recovered by: Soviet Union
- Landing date: August 14, 1969 at 20:13 UTC
- Landing site: 50 km south of Kustanai, Kazakhstan, USSR

Flyby of Moon
- Closest approach: August 11, 1969
- Distance: 1,984.6 km (1,233.2 mi)

The Zond 7 spacecraft, part of the Soviet Zond program, was launched towards the Moon on a Proton-K D rocket on August 7, 1969. Its mission was to support studies of the Moon and circumlunar space, to obtain color photography of Earth and the Moon from varying distances, and to flight test the spacecraft systems. It was an unpiloted version of the Soyuz 7K-L1, a crewed Moon-flyby spacecraft.

== History ==
Earth photos were obtained on August 9, 1969. On August 11, 1969, the spacecraft flew past the Moon at a distance of 1984.6 km and conducted two picture-taking sessions. On its way back from the Moon, the spacecraft tested its radio systems by transmitting recorded voices.

Zond 7 carried four turtles, a follow-up to the September 1968 Zond 5 mission which carried two tortoises on a circumlunar lunar mission, and the November 1968 Zond 6 mission which also carried turtles.

A human-like tissue-equivalent phantom for radiation measurements was placed aboard. The phantom was equipped with 20 channels for radiation detectors (thermoluminescent glasses and nuclear photoemulsions) distributed along the whole body for measurement of doses in critical organs. The doses accumulated during the flight through the radiation belts and around the Moon were between 0.2 and 0.7 rad in different points at the depth of 3 g/cm^{2} from the body surface.

Like other Zond circumlunar craft, Zond 7 used a relatively uncommon technique called skip reentry to shed velocity upon returning to Earth. Of all circumlunar Soviet Zond craft launches, Zond 7 would have been the first to make a safe flight for a cosmonaut had it been crewed.

Zond 7 reentered Earth's atmosphere on August 14, 1969, and achieved a soft landing in a preset region south of Kustanai, Kazakhstan. The return capsule is on display at the Dmitrov Facility of Bauman University in Orevo, Russia.

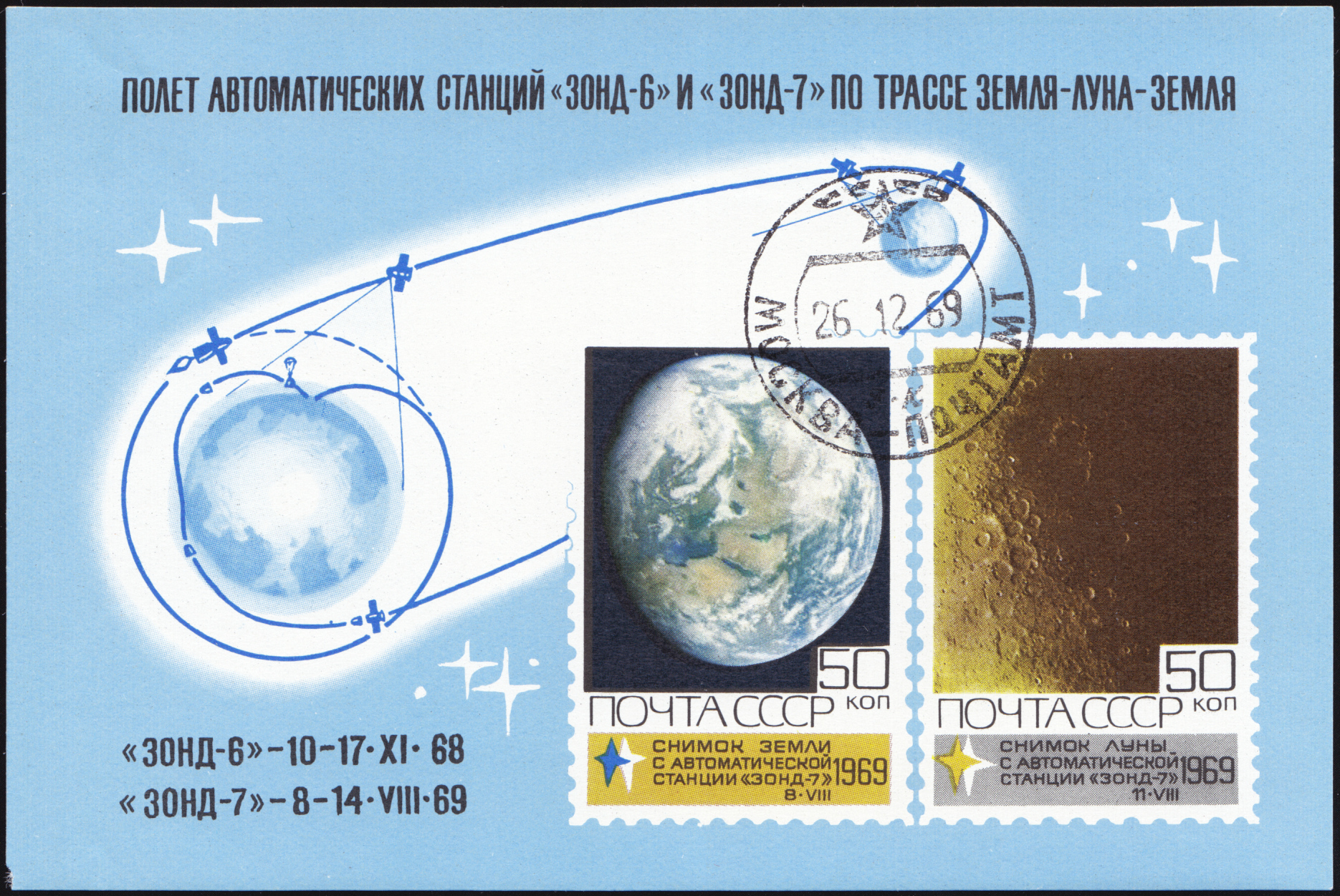
Zond 7 orbit, photographs of the Earth and the Moon on a USSR miniature sheet, 1969

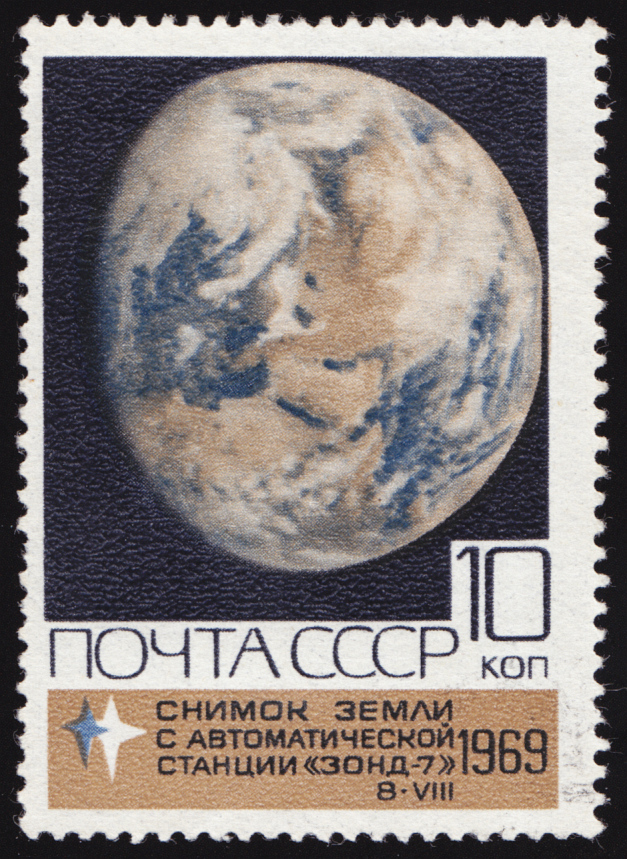
A photograph of the Earth taken by Zond 7 on a postage stamp of the USSR in 1969

== See also ==
- Animals in space
- Timeline of first images of Earth from space
- Zond 5, two tortoises who flew to the Moon on the Soviet Union's September 1968 Zond 5 circumlunar flight
- Zond 6, turtles on a circumlunar mission in November 1968
- Fee, Fi, Fo, Fum, and Phooey, five mice who orbited the Moon a record 75 times on the December 1972 Apollo 17 mission
- List of missions to the Moon

== Notes ==
- This article was originally based on material from NASA (NSSDC) information on Zond 7

Preceded by Zond 6	Zond program (circumlunar)	Succeeded by Zond 8
