= Zond 3 =

1965 Soviet moon probe

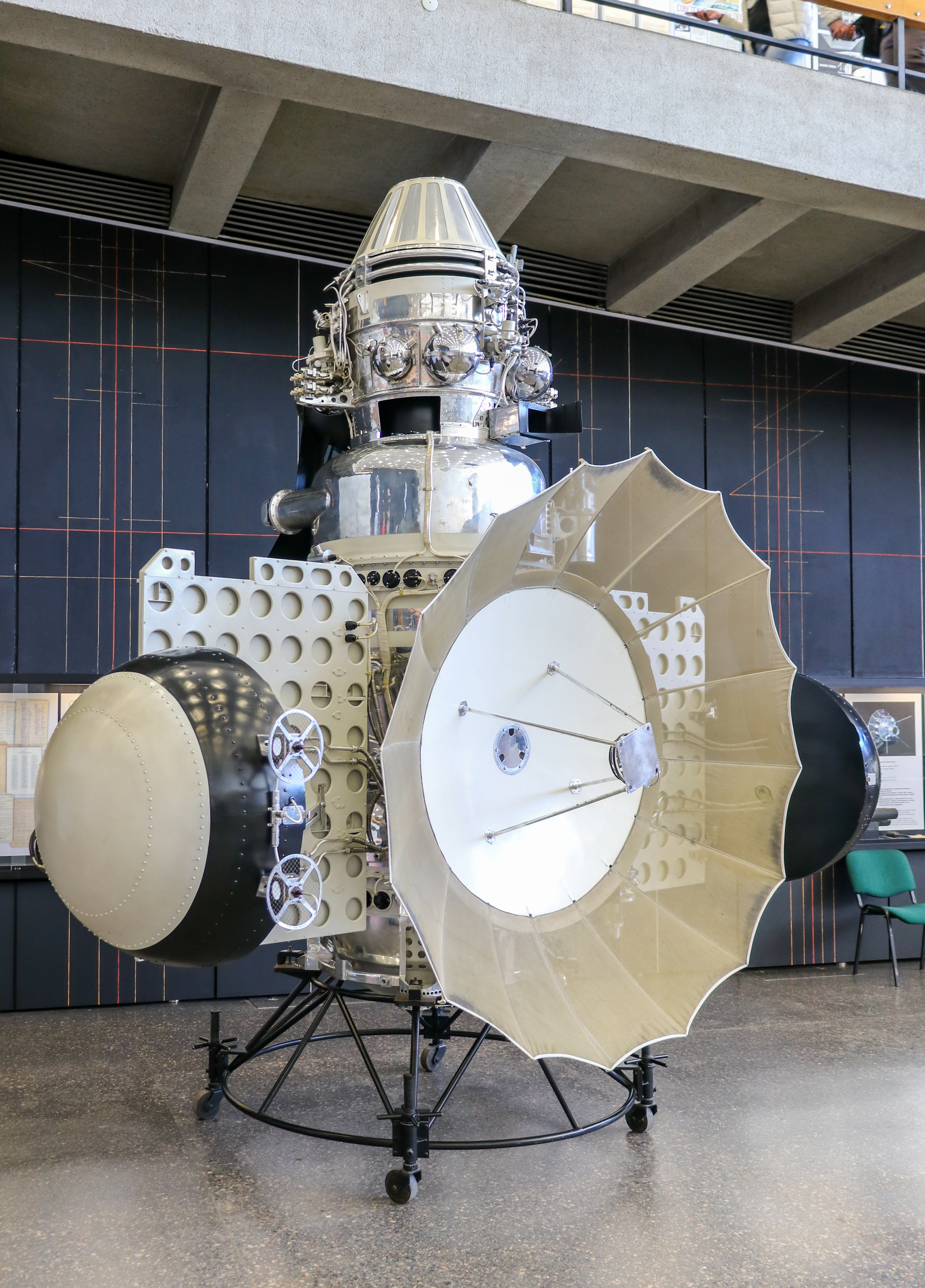
- Mission type: Lunar science
- Operator: OKB-1
- COSPAR ID: 1965-056A
- SATCAT no.: 01454
- Mission duration: 228 days

Spacecraft properties
- Spacecraft type: 3MV-4
- Manufacturer: OKB-1
- Launch mass: 950 kg (2,090 lb)

Start of mission
- Launch date: July 18, 1965, 14:32 UTC
- Rocket: Molniya SL-6/A-2-e
- Launch site: Baikonur LC-1/5

End of mission
- Last contact: March 3, 1966

Orbital parameters
- Reference system: Heliocentric
- Eccentricity: 0.2683
- Perihelion altitude: 0.9 AU (130 million km)
- Aphelion altitude: 1.56 AU (233 million km)
- Inclination: 0.5°
- Period: 500 days
- Epoch: July 19, 1965, 20:00 UTC

Flyby of Moon
- Closest approach: July 20, 1965
- Distance: 9,219 km (5,728 mi)
Instruments
- f/8, 106.4 mm focal length camera
- Ultraviolet (0.25–0.35 μm) spectrograph
- Ultraviolet (0.19–0.27 μm) spectrophotometer
- Infrared (3–4 μm) spectrophotometer
- Micrometeoroid detector
- Radiation sensors (gas-discharge and scintillation counters)

Zond 3 was a 1965 space probe which performed a flyby of the Moon's far side, taking 28 quality photographs. It was a member of the Soviet Zond program while also being part of the Mars 3MV project. It was unrelated to Zond spacecraft designed for crewed circumlunar missions (Soyuz 7K-L1). It is believed that Zond 3 was initially designed as a companion spacecraft to Zond 2 to be launched to Mars during the 1964 launch window. The opportunity to launch was missed, and the spacecraft was launched on a Mars-crossing trajectory as a spacecraft test, even though Mars was no longer attainable.

== Spacecraft design ==
The spacecraft was of the 3MV-4 type, similar to Zond 2. In addition to a 106.4 mm focal length f/8 imaging system for visible light photography and ultraviolet spectrometry at 285-355 nm, it carried ultraviolet (190-275 nm) and infrared (3-4 μm) spectrophotometers, radiation sensors (gas-discharge and scintillation counters), charged particle detector, magnetometer, and micrometeoroid detector. It also had an experimental ion engine.

== Operational history ==
Zond 3 was launched from Baikonur Cosmodrome on July 18, 1965, at 14:38 UTC, and was deployed from a Tyazhely Sputnik (65-056B) Earth-orbiting platform towards the Moon and interplanetary space. This was a repeat of a mission that failed in late 1963 intended to test communication at distances equivalent to the distances experienced by Mars and Earth.

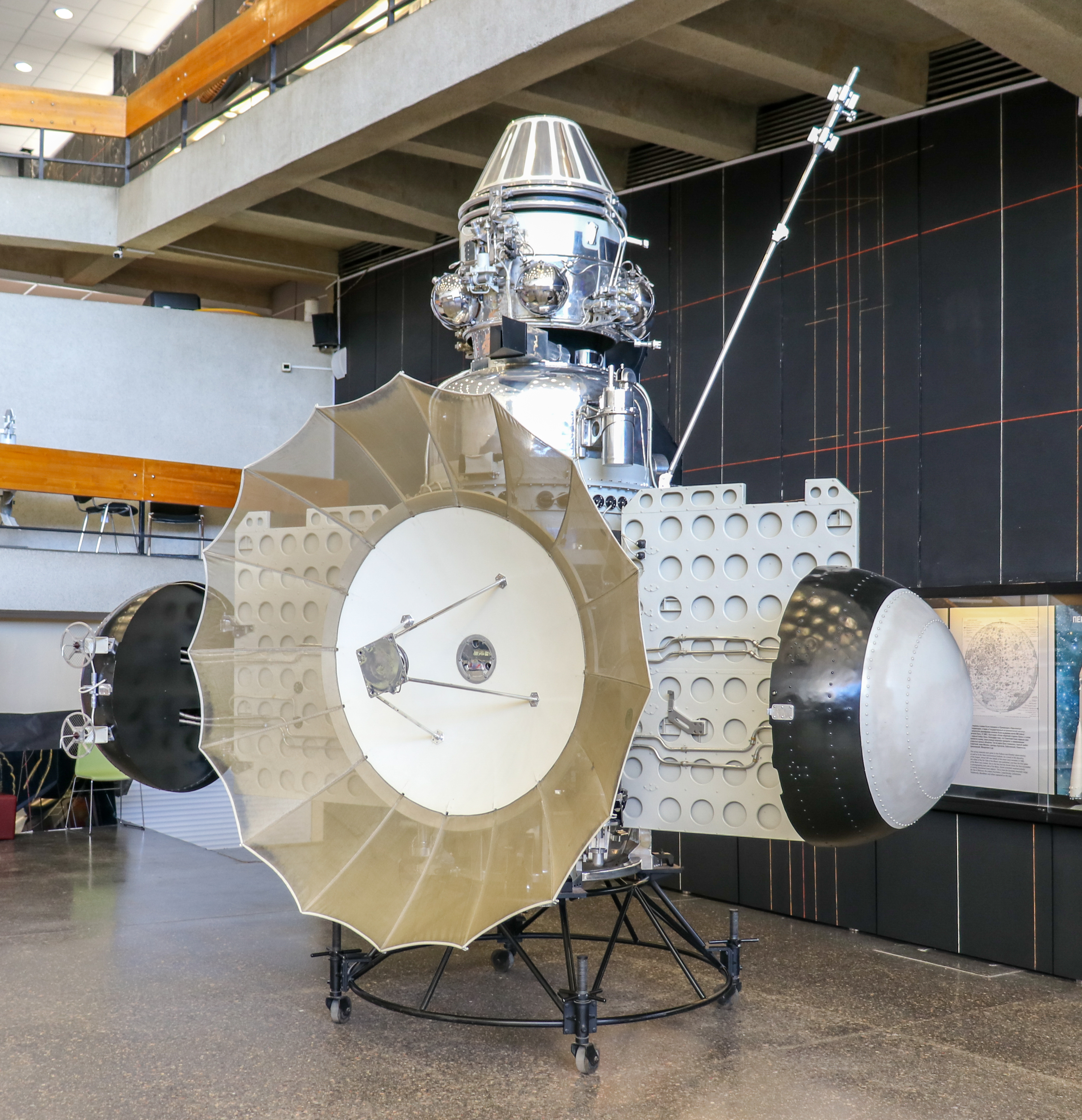
Other angle of Zond 3

Zond 3's lunar flyby occurred on July 20 with a closest approach of 9,219 km (5,728 mi), approximately 35 hours after launch. 25 visible light photographs and 3 ultraviolet spectra of very good quality were taken of the lunar surface, beginning at 01:24 UTC and 11,570 km (7,190 mi) prior to closest approach and ending at 02:32 UTC and 9,960 km (6,190 mi) past closest approach, covering a period of 68 minutes. The photos covered 19 million km^{2} (7.3 million sq mi) of the lunar surface, including the remaining 30% of the moon's far side.

Zond 3 proceeded on a trajectory across Mars' orbit, but not at a time when planetary encounter would occur. These images were transmitted by radio frequency on July 29 at a distance of 2.25 million km (1.40 million mi). To test telemetry, the camera film was rewound and retransmitted in mid-August, mid-September, and finally on October 23 at a distance of 31.5 million km (19.6 million mi), thus proving the ability of the communications system. The subsequent transmissions were also at progressively slower data rates but higher quality. The mission was ended after radio contact ceased on March 3, 1966, when it was at a distance of 153.5 million km (95.4 million mi). It operated for 228 days, roughly equivalent to the time needed to survive a journey to Mars and exceeding that needed for Venus.

== Legacy ==
In 1967, the second part of the Atlas of the Far Side of the Moon was published in Moscow, based on data from Zond 3, with the catalog now including 4,000 newly discovered features of the lunar far side landscape. In the same year, the first Complete Map of the Moon (1:5000000 scale) and updated complete globe (1:10000000 scale), featuring 95 percent of the lunar surface, were released in the Soviet Union. Zond 3 had also become the first soviet spacecraft to demostrate successful course corrections using both stellar and solar orientation.

| Preceded by Zond 2 | Zond program | Succeeded by None |
