= Zond 6 =

Unsuccessful 1968 Soviet test spaceflight to the Moon

- Names: Soyuz 7K-L1 s/n 12
- Mission type: Planetary Science
- Operator: Lavochkin
- COSPAR ID: 1968-101A
- SATCAT no.: 03535
- Mission duration: 7 days

Spacecraft properties
- Manufacturer: NPO Energia Company
- Launch mass: 5,375 kg (11,850 lb)

Start of mission
- Launch date: 19:11:31, 10 November 1968 (UTC)
- Rocket: Proton-K/11S824
- Launch site: Baikonur 81/26

End of mission
- Disposal: Crash landed
- Landing date: 17 November 1968 14:10 UT
- Landing site: 70 km NE of Tyuratam, Kazakhstan, USSR

Orbital parameters
- Perigee altitude: 120 km (75 mi)
- Apogee altitude: 400,000 km (250,000 mi)
- Inclination: 51.5°
- Period: 500 days

Flyby of Moon
- Closest approach: 14 November 1968
- Distance: 2,420 km (1,500 mi)
Instruments
- cosmic ray and micrometeoroid detectors
- photography equipment
- biological payload

Zond 6 was a formal member of the Soviet Zond program, and an unpiloted version of the Soyuz 7K-L1 crewed Moon-flyby spacecraft. It was launched on a lunar flyby mission on November 10, 1968, from a parent satellite (68-101B) in Earth parking orbit. The spacecraft carried a biological payload of turtles, flies, and bacteria. It also carried scientific probes including cosmic ray, micrometeoroid detectors, and photographic equipment.

The mission was a precursor to a crewed circumlunar flight which the Soviets hoped could occur in December 1968, thus beating the American Apollo 8. However, after rounding the Moon on November 14, Zond 6 crashed on its return to Earth, due to a parachute failure when the parachute was detached from the capsule too early.

== Mission ==
Zond 6 was the official designation for Soyuz 7K-L1 s/n 12. It was supposed to photograph the Moon in colour and in black and white, from 8,000 km and 2,600 km ranges, then return to Earth, landing at Tyuratam, only 16 km from the launch pad. It had been a long and difficult road to develop the L1 guidance system, but it worked perfectly that time.

Zond 6 flew around the Moon on 14 November 1968, at a minimum distance of 2,420 km. Photographs of the lunar near side and far side were obtained with panchromatic film. Each photo was 5 by 7 in (130 by 180 mm). Some of the views allowed for stereo pictures. The photos were taken from distances of approximately 11,000 km and 3,300 km.

The flight was tracked by Jodrell Bank Observatory, which picked up telemetry data and voice transmissions. The telemetry data appear to have been simulated sensor readings; the voices were either from a tape recorder or being relayed through the probe. In 2018, a recording of the signals was found in Jodrell Bank's archive.

During the craft's return from the Moon, concerns arose about the falling temperatures of the hydrogen peroxide tanks. This issue was addressed by rotating Zond 6 so that the tanks were in direct sunlight. While this was successful in raising the temperatures of the tanks, it also damaged the seal around the door of the re-entry cabin, resulting in the spacecraft starting to leak and the pressure in the cabin falling.

Zond 6 used a relatively uncommon technique called "skip reentry" to shed velocity upon returning to Earth which limited deceleration forces to 4-7 g. A few hours before reentry, on 17 November 1968, the cabin largely depressurised, killing all the animal test subjects aboard. A further problem resulted in Zond 6's parachutes ejecting while the cabin was still several miles up. The craft crashed in Kazakhstan, near the designated landing area.

Investigation of the remains of the spacecraft was delayed while the self-destruct system was located and removed. The craft's film magazines could then be recovered, and the images therein were published, along with claims that the mission had been entirely successful.

A State Commission investigating the crash later determined that the coronal discharge effect which caused the parachute to jettison would only occur at the 25 mmHg (3.3 kPa) capsule pressure. If the capsule had been completely depressurised to a high vacuum, the accident would not have occurred.

== Details ==
- Launch Date/Time: 1968-11-10 at 19:11:31 UTC
- On-orbit dry mass: 5375 kg

== See also ==
- 1968 in spaceflight
- Animals in space
- Zond 5, two tortoises who flew to the Moon on the Soviet Union's September 1968 Zond 5 circumlunar flight
- Zond 7, four turtles flew the August 1969 circumlunar flight
- Fee, Fi, Fo, Fum, and Phooey, five mice who orbited the Moon a record 75 times on the December 1972 Apollo 17 mission
- List of missions to the Moon
