= Kosmos 146 =

1967 Soviet test spaceflight

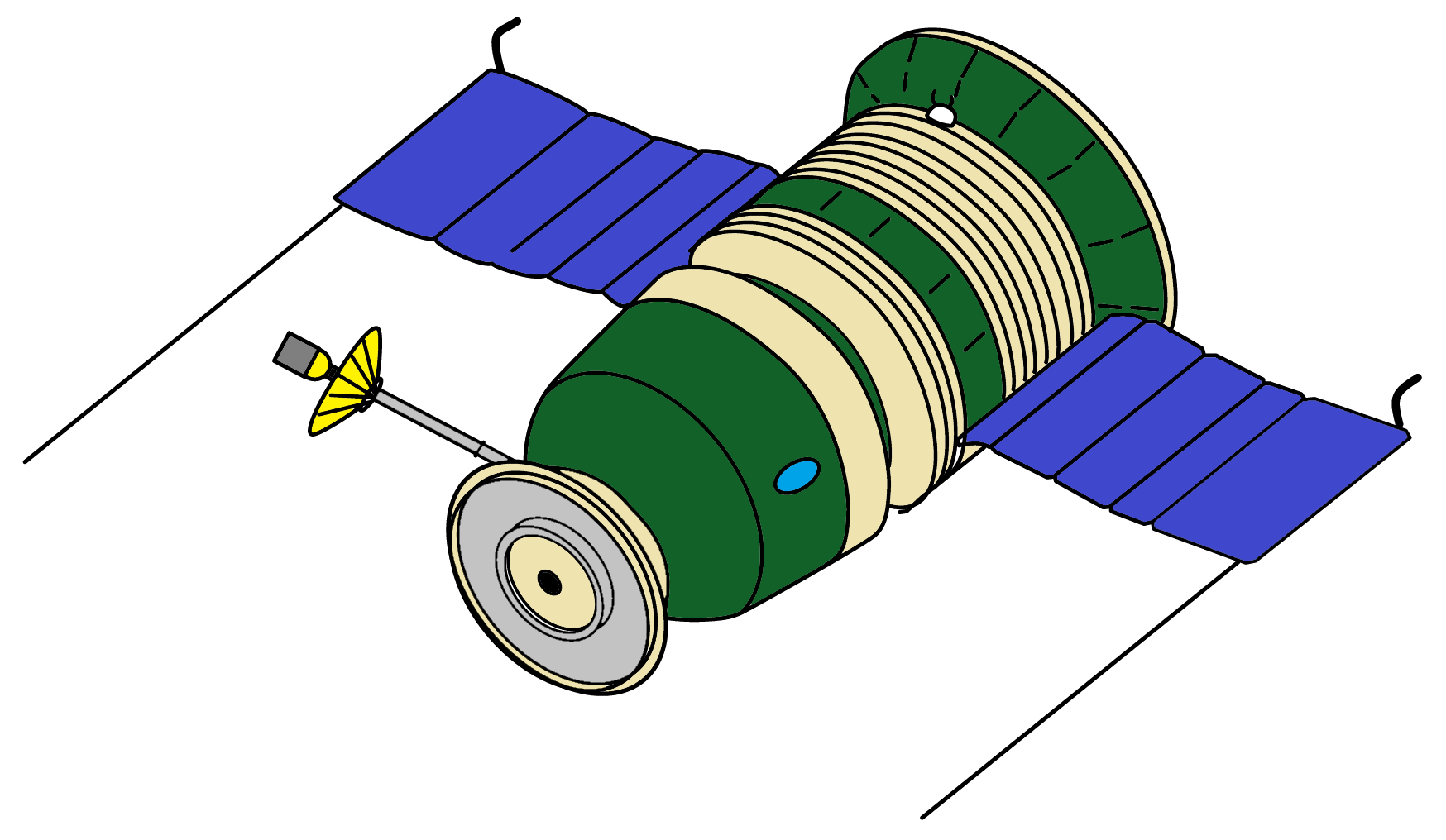
- A color drawing of a Zond L1 spacecraft
- Mission type: Test flight
- Operator: Soviet space program
- COSPAR ID: 1967-021A
- SATCAT no.: 02705
- Mission duration: 8 days

Spacecraft properties
- Spacecraft: Soyuz 7K-L1 No. 2P
- Spacecraft type: Soyuz 7K-L1
- Manufacturer: OKB-1
- Launch mass: 5375 kg

Start of mission
- Launch date: 10 March 1967, 11:30:33 GMT
- Rocket: Proton-K / Blok D
- Launch site: Baikonur, Site 81/23
- Contractor: OKB-1

End of mission
- Disposal: Deorbited
- Decay date: March 18, 1967

Orbital parameters
- Reference system: Geocentric^{[a]}
- Regime: Highly elliptical Earth^{[a]}
- Periapsis altitude: 177 km^{[a]}
- Apoapsis altitude: 296 km^{[a]}
- Inclination: 51.5°^{[a]}
- Period: 89.2 minutes^{[a]}
- Epoch: 10 March 1967

Kosmos 146 (Russian: Космос 146, lit. 'Cosmos 146'), also known as Soyuz 7K-L1 No. 2P, was a Soviet test spacecraft precursor to the Zond series, launched from the Baikonur Cosmodrome aboard the inaugural flight of the Proton-K rocket, an improved version of the Proton, which had been launched four times before.

The spacecraft was designed to launch a crew from the Earth to conduct a flyby of the Moon and return to Earth. The primary focus was a circumlunar flight, which would help document the Moon while also showing Soviet power. The test ran from the Zond program from 1967 to 1970, which produced multiple failures in the 7K-L1's re-entry systems. The remaining 7K-L1s were scrapped, ultimately replaced by the Soyuz 7K-L3.

== Objectives ==
Kosmos 146 was a Soviet test precursor to the Zond series, launched from the Baikonur cosmodrome aboard a Proton K rocket. It was launched into a planned highly elliptical Earth orbit. The Blok D stage functioned correctly in putting the spacecraft into a translunar trajectory. It was not aimed at the Moon and no recovery of the spacecraft was planned or attempted. It was a successful mission that created false confidence just before a string of failures that would follow.

Kosmos 146 was launched using a Proton-K carrier rocket, which flew from Site 81/23 at Baikonur. The launch occurred at 11:30:33 GMT on 10 March 1967 and was successful. Kosmos 146 was operated in an Earth orbit, it had a perigee of 177 kilometres (110 mi), an apogee of 296 kilometres (184 mi), an inclination of 51.5° and an orbital period of 89.2 minutes. Kosmos 146 decayed from orbit on 18 March 1967.

== Moon race ==
By the time the spacecraft was launched, the United States had already deployed prototypes of their lunar vehicle (AS-201, AS-202, AS-203) in low earth orbit. The United States flight tests came to a halt when the crew of Apollo 1 was killed by a fire in the command module two months before the launch of Kosmos 146.
