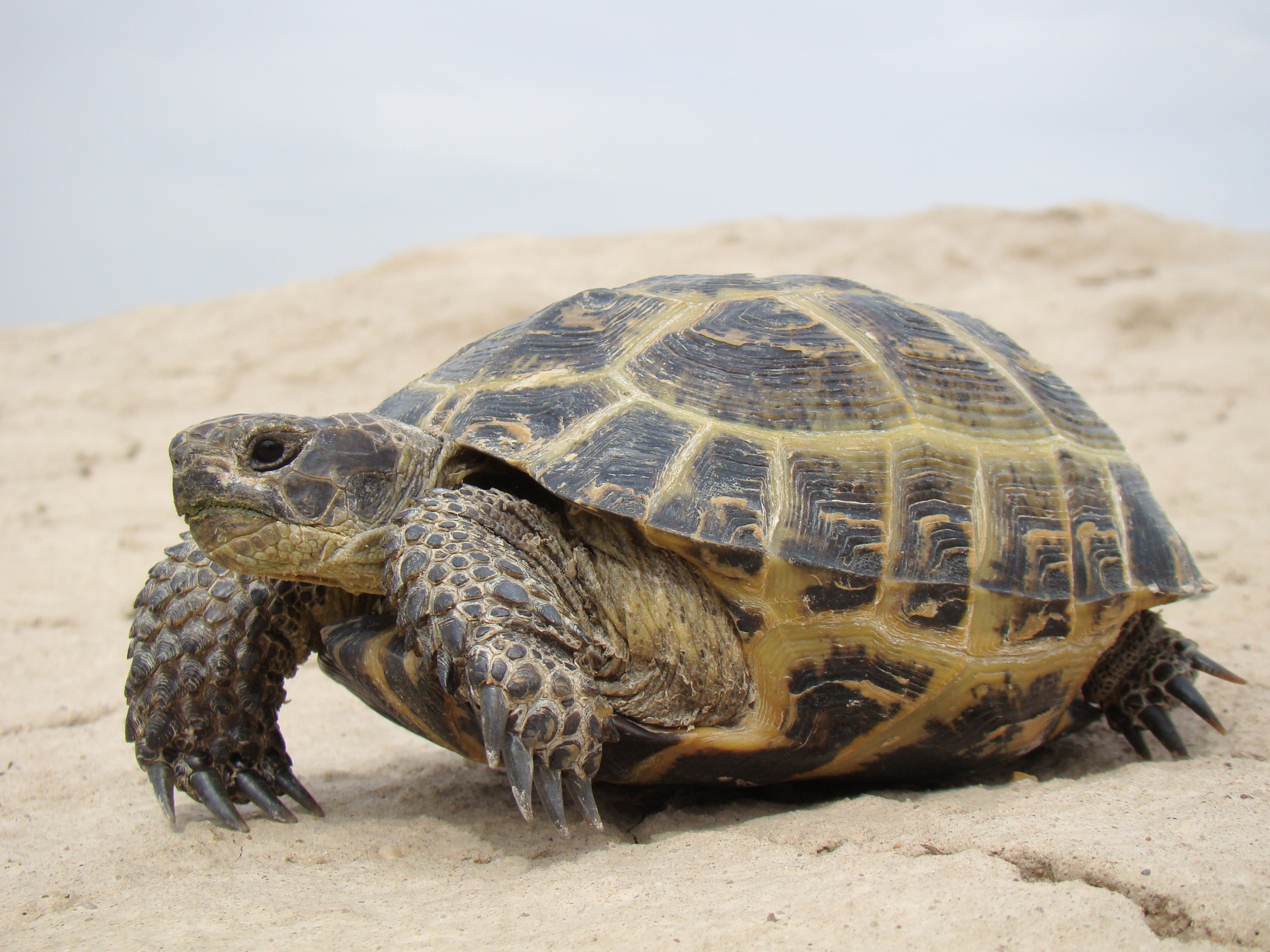
- A Russian tortoise in Kazakhstan

Conservation status
- Vulnerable (IUCN 2.3)

Scientific classification
- Kingdom: Animalia
- Phylum: Chordata
- Class: Reptilia
- Order: Testudines
- Suborder: Cryptodira
- Family: Testudinidae
- Genus: Testudo
- Species: T. horsfieldii

Binomial name
- Testudo horsfieldii Gray, 1844

Subspecies
- T. h. bogdanovi Chkhikvadze, 2008; T. h. horsfieldii (Gray, 1844); T. h. kazachstanica Chkhikvadze, 1988; T. h. kuznetzovi Chkhikvadze, Ataev, Shammakov & Zatoka, 2009; T. h. rustamovi Chkhikvadze, Amiranschwili & Atajew, 1990

Synonyms
- A. h. horsfieldii: Testudinella horsfieldii — Gray, 1870; Testudinella horsfieldi Gray, 1873 (ex errore); Homopus horsfieldii — Theobald, 1876; Testudo baluchiorum Annandale, 1906; Medaestia horsfieldi — Wussow, 1916; Testudo horsfieldi — Wussow, 1916; Agrionemys horsfieldi — Khosatzky & Młynarski, 1966; Agrionemys horsfieldii — Młynarski, 1966; Testudo horsfieldii horsfieldii — Iverson, 1992; Agrionemys horsfieldii horsfieldii — Welch, 1994; Agrionemys horsfildii Rogner, 1996 (ex errore); Testudo horsfieldi horsfieldi — Highfield, 1996; Agrionemys baluchiorum — Vetter, 2002; Agrionemys horsfieldii baluchiorum — Artner, 2003; T. h. kazachstanica: Agrionemys horsfieldi kazachstanica Chkhikvadze, 1988; Testudo horsfieldii kazachstanica — Iverson, 1992; Agrionemys horsfieldii kazachstanica — Welch, 1994; Testudo horsfieldi kazachtanica Highfield, 1996 (ex errore); Agrionemys horsfieldii kazakhstanica Borkin, 1998 (ex errore); Agrionemys kazachstanica — Perälä, 2002; Testudo horsfieldi kazachstanica — Ferri, 2002; T. h. rustamovi: Agrionemys horsfieldi rustamovi Chkhikvadze, 1989 (nomen nudum); Agrionemys horsfieldi rustamovi Chkhikvadze, Amiranashvili & Ataev, 1990; Agrionemys horsfieldi rustamowi Chkhikvadze, Amiranashvili & Ataev, 1990 (ex errore); Testudo horsfieldii rustamovi — Iverson, 1992; Agrionemys horsfieldii rustamovi — Welch, 1994; Testudo horsfieldii rustomovi Das, 1995 (ex errore); Testudo horsfieldi rustmovi Highfield, 1996 (ex errore); Testudo horsfieldii rustamov Paull, 1997 (ex errore); Agrionemys rustamovi — Perälä, 2002; Testudo horsfieldi rustamovi — Ferri, 2002

= Central Asian tortoise =

Species of tortoise

The Central Asian tortoise (Testudo horsfieldii), also commonly known as the Afghan tortoise, the steppe tortoise, the Russian tortoise (mainly in the pet trade), Horsfield's tortoise, the four-clawed tortoise, the four-toed tortoise, the Russian steppe tortoise, the Soviet tortoise, is a threatened species of tortoise in the family Testudinidae. The species is endemic to Central Asia from the Caspian Sea south through Iran, Pakistan and Afghanistan, and east across Kazakhstan to Xinjiang, China. Human activities in its native habitat contribute to its threatened status.

Two Testudo horsfieldii tortoises were the first Earth inhabitants to travel to and circle the Moon, on Zond 5 in September 1968.

== Etymology ==
Both the specific name, horsfieldii, and the common name "Horsfield's tortoise" are in honor of the American naturalist Thomas Horsfield. He worked in Java (1796) and for the East India Company and later became a friend of Sir Thomas Raffies.

It is also widely known in the pet trade as the “Russian tortoise,” reflecting the historical pattern of the mid-1970s, when the animals were heavily exported from their native Central Asian range for the international pet trade. Because these exports came from the Soviet Union, which was often colloquially called “Russia” in the West, the name became established in pet contexts.

== Systematics ==
This species is traditionally placed in Testudo. Due to distinctly different morphological characteristics, the monotypic genus Agrionemys was proposed for it in 1966, and was accepted for several decades, although not unanimously. DNA sequence analysis generally concurred, but not too robustly so. However, in 2021, it was again reclassified in Testudo by the Turtle Taxonomy Working Group and the Reptile Database, with Agrionemys being relegated to a distinct subgenus that T. horsfieldii belonged to. The Turtle Taxonomy Working Group lists five separate subspecies of Russian tortoise, but they are not widely accepted by taxonomists:

- T. h. bogdanovi Chkhikvadze, 2008 – southern Kyrgyzstan, Tajikistan, Uzbekistan, Turkmenistan
- T. h. horsfieldii (Gray, 1844) – Afghanistan/Pakistan and southern Central Asia
- T. h. kazachstanica Chkhikvadze, 1988 – Kazakhstan/Karakalpakhstan
- T. h. kuznetzovi Chkhikvadze, Ataev, Shammakov & Zatoka, 2009 – northern Turkmenistan, southern Uzbekistan
- T. h. rustamovi Chkhikvadze, Amiranschwili & Atajew, 1990 – southwestern Turkmenistan

== Description ==
The Russian tortoise is a small tortoise species, with a size range of 13–25 cm (5–10 in). Females grow slightly larger (15–25 cm [6–10 in]) to accommodate eggs. Males average 13–20 cm (5–8 in).

Russian tortoises are sexually dimorphic. Males are usually smaller than the females, and the males tend to have longer tails generally tucked to the side, and longer claws; females have a short, fat tail, with shorter claws than the males. The male has a slit-shaped vent (cloaca) near the tip of its tail; the female has an asterisk-shaped vent (cloaca). Russian tortoises have four toes on their front limbs, unusual compared to other tortoises for having five. Coloration varies, but the shell is usually a ruddy brown or black, fading to yellow between the scutes, and the body is straw-yellow and brown depending on the subspecies.

The male Russian tortoise courts a female through head bobbing, circling, and biting her forelegs. When she submits, he mounts her from behind, making high-pitched squeaking noises during mating.

On average, Russian tortoises will hibernate for about 8 weeks to 5 months throughout the year, if the conditions are right. The species can spend as much as 9 months of the year in dormancy.

== Habitat ==
Russian tortoises thrive in dry, open areas. They keep to sandy locations, where they can get around easily and burrow. Despite preferring arid environments primarily, Russian tortoises can survive well where humidity is 70 percent, and actually need some rain to soften the soil so they can dig their burrows. These burrows can be as deep as 2 meters (6 ft 7 in), where it retreats during the midday heat and at night, only emerging to forage at dawn or dusk when temperatures drop. These tortoises are quite social, and they will visit nearby burrows, and sometimes several will spend the night in one burrow.

== Captivity ==
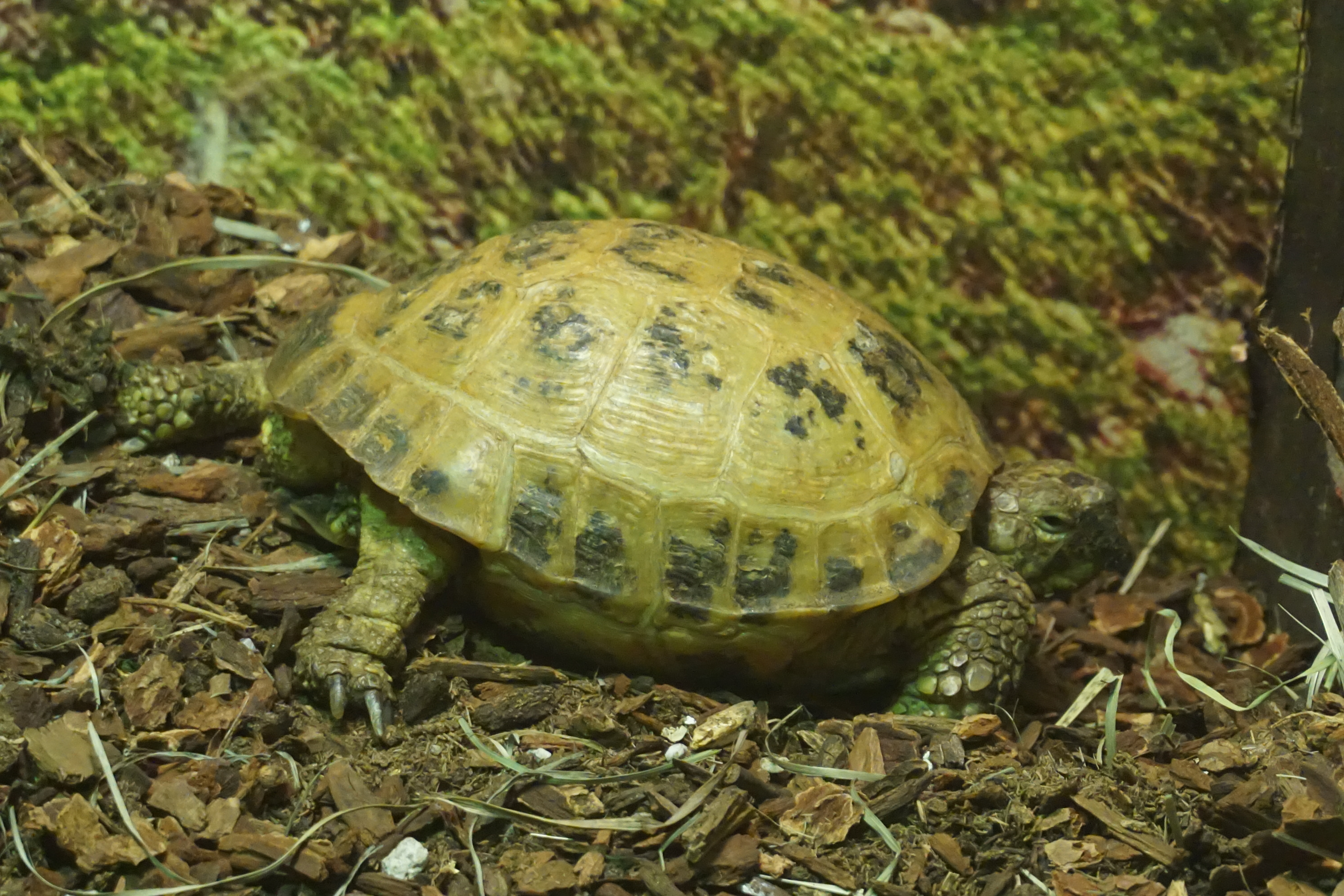
A Russian tortoise at the Milwaukee Public Museum

Russian tortoises are popular pets. While they are a hardy species, they do have some specific needs. Russian tortoises requires a very dry, well-drained cage in an indoor enclosure. They can be kept indoors or outdoors, but outdoor tortoise enclosures generally require less equipment and upkeep, and are preferable if the keeper lives in an appropriate climate. Indoor enclosures should measure 8'L x 4'W x 2.5'H (2.44 m × 1.22 m × 0.76 m), or otherwise offer 32 square feet (3.0 m^{2}) of floor space. Indoors, specialized equipment is required to maintain moderate temperatures and moderate humidity, with UVB light available in an appropriate strength.

In captivity, Russian tortoises' diet typically consists of lamb's lettuce, plantains and various other dark leafy greens. The Russian tortoise's natural diet consists of herbaceous and succulent vegetation including grasses, twigs, flowers and some fruits. The diet should be as varied as possible to reduce the risk of imbalanced nutrition. Water is important for all species; the tortoise, being an arid species, will typically get water from their food, but they still need a constant supply. Young Russian tortoises should be soaked 1-2x/weekly in lukewarm water no deeper than their elbows to keep hydrated. Tortoises typically empty their bowels in water to hide their scent; this is an instinct, and it also helps keep their enclosure cleaner.

Russian tortoises can live up to 50 years, and require annual hibernation.

Russian tortoises do not require a CITES Article X certificate.

== 1968 Moon flight ==
In September 1968 two Russian tortoises flew to the Moon, circled it, and returned safely to Earth on the Soviet Zond 5 mission. Accompanied by fruit fly eggs, plants, and other lifeforms, they were the first Earth creatures to travel to the Moon.
