= Zond program =

Series of Soviet robotic space probes launched between 1964 and 1970

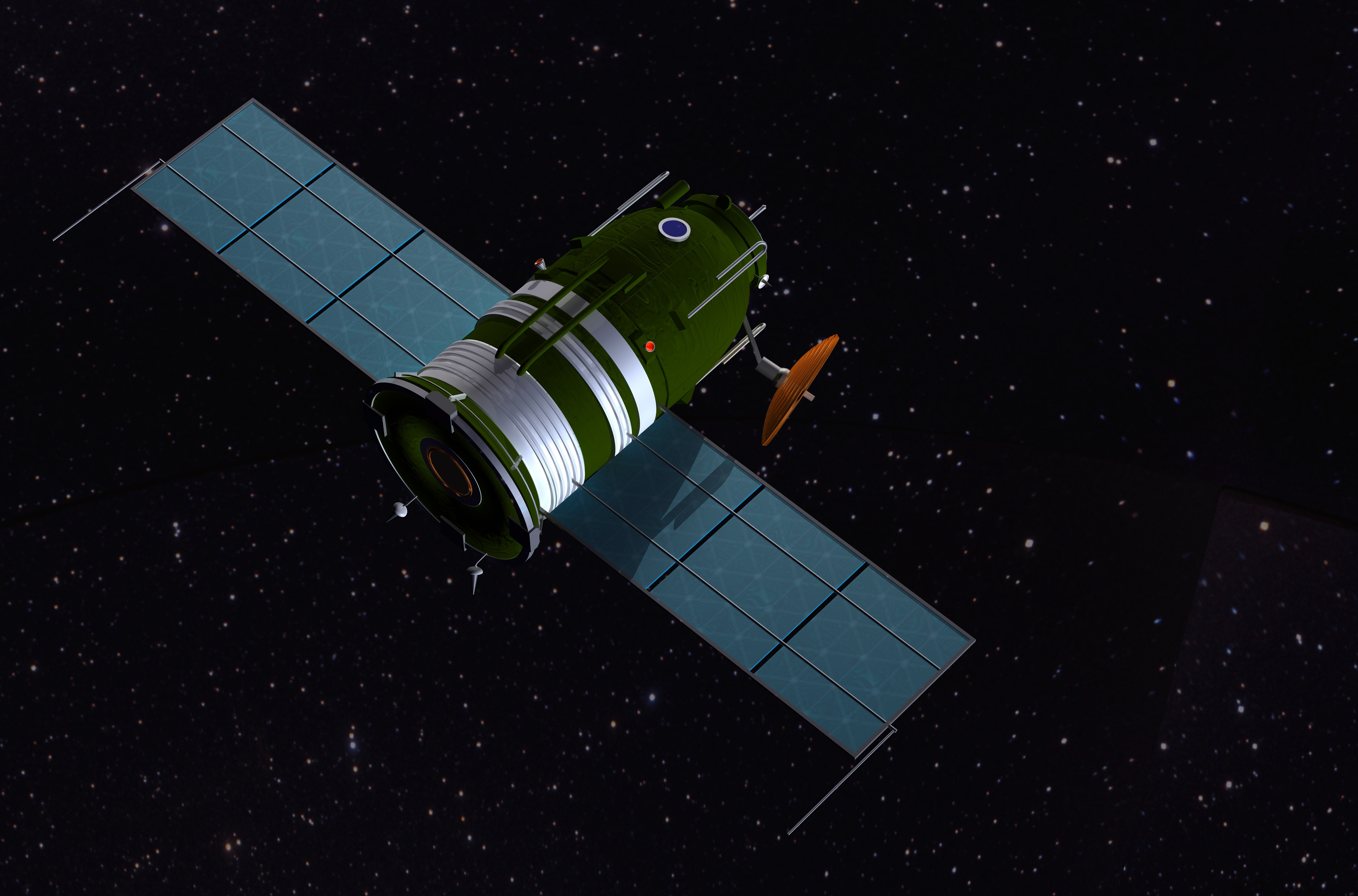
An artist's impression of a Zond spacecraft en route to the Moon.

Zond (Russian: Зонд, lit. 'probe') was the name given to two distinct series of Soviet robotic spacecraft launched between 1964 and 1970. The first series, based on the 3MV planetary probe, was intended to gather information about nearby planets.

The second series of test spacecraft was intended as a precursor to remote-controlled robotic circumlunar loop flights, using a stripped-down variant of Soyuz spacecraft, consisting of the service and descent modules, but lacking the orbital module.

Two tortoises and other lifeforms aboard Zond 5 were the first terrestrial organisms to travel around the Moon and return to Earth.

== Missions based on the 3MV planetary probe ==
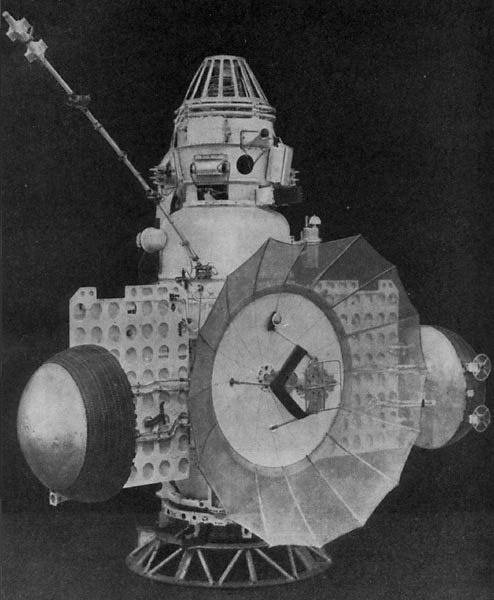
Zond 2 (interplanetary) part of 3MV family

The first three missions were based on the model 3MV planetary probe, intended to explore Venus and Mars. After two failures, Zond 3 was sent on a test mission, becoming the second spacecraft to photograph the far side of the Moon (after Luna 3). It then continued out to the orbit of Mars in order to test telemetry and spacecraft systems.

== Circumlunar missions ==
The missions Zond 4 through Zond 8 were test flights for the Soviet Moonshot during the Moon race. The Soyuz 7K-L1 (also mentioned just as L1) spacecraft was used for the Moon-aimed missions, stripped down to make it possible to launch around the Moon from the Earth. They were launched on the Proton rocket which was just powerful enough to send the Zond on a free return trajectory around the Moon without going into lunar orbit (the same kind of path flown by Apollo 13 in its emergency abort in 1970, as well as by Artemis II in 2026). With minor modification, Zond was capable of carrying two cosmonauts.

In the beginning, there were serious reliability problems with both the new Proton rocket and the similarly new Soyuz spacecraft, but the test flights pressed ahead with some glitches. The majority of test flights from 1967 to 1970 (Zond 4 to Zond 8) showed problems during re-entry.

The Zond spacecraft made only uncrewed automatic flights. Four of these suffered malfunctions that would have injured or killed any crew. Instrumentation flown on these missions gathered data on micrometeor flux, solar and cosmic rays, magnetic fields, radio emissions, and solar wind. Many photographs were taken and biological payloads were also flown.

== Timetable ==
=== 3MV planetary probe based missions ===
- Zond 1
  - Launched 2 April 1964
  - Communications lost 14 May 1964
  - Venus flyby 14 July 1964
- Zond 2
  - Launched 30 November 1964
  - Communications lost May 1965
  - Mars flyby 6 August 1965
- Zond 3
  - Launched 18 July 1965
  - Lunar Flyby 20 July 1965
  - Communications lost 3 March 1966

=== Soyuz 7K-L1/L1S test missions ===
- Kosmos 146
  - Launched 10 March 1967
  - Prototype Soyuz 7K-L1P launched by Proton into planned highly elliptical Earth orbit.
- Kosmos 154
  - Launched 8 April 1967
  - Prototype Soyuz 7K-L1P launched by Proton and failed to go into a planned translunar trajectory.
- Zond 1967A
  - Launched 28 September 1967
  - Fell off course 60 seconds after launch. Escape tower took the Zond capsule safely away. The rocket crashed 65 km (40 mi) downrange.
  - Attempted Lunar flyby
- Zond 1967B
  - Launched 22 November 1967
  - Second stage failure. The Zond capsule was safely recovered. The rocket crashed 300 km (190 mi) downrange.
  - Attempted Lunar flyby
- Zond 4
  - Launched 2 March 1968
  - Study of remote regions of circumterrestrial space, development of new on-board systems and units of space stations.
  - Returned to Earth 7 March 1968 – Self destruct system automatically blew up the capsule at 10 to 15 km (6.2 to 9.3 mi) altitude, 180–200 km (110–120 mi) off the African coast at Guinea.
- Zond 1968A
  - Launched 23 April 1968
  - Second stage failed 260 seconds after launch.
  - Attempted Lunar flyby
- Zond 1968B (Zond 7K-L1 s/n 8L)
  - Launched 21 July 1968
  - Block D stage exploded on the pad, killing three people.
- Zond 5
  - Launched 15 September 1968
  - Circumlunar 18 September 1968
  - Returned to Earth 21 September 1968
  - A biological payload of two Russian tortoises, wine flies, meal worms, plants, seeds, bacteria, and other living matter was included in the flight and were the first Earth lifeforms to travel around the Moon and return safely.
  - The first spacecraft to circle the Moon and return to land on Earth.
- Zond 6
  - Launched 10 November 1968
  - Circumlunar 14 November 1968
  - Returned to Earth 17 November 1968
  - The second circumlunar spaceflight to include lifeforms from Earth, Zond 6 carried a biological payload of turtles, flies, and bacteria. It also carried scientific probes including cosmic ray, micrometeoroid detectors, and photographic equipment.
- Zond 1969A
  - Launched 20 January 1969
  - Stage two shut down 25 seconds early. Automatic flight abort. The capsule was safely recovered.
  - Attempted Lunar flyby
- Zond L1S-1
  - Launched 21 February 1969
  - First stage failure. The capsule escape system fired 70 seconds after launch. The capsule was recovered.
  - Attempted Lunar orbiter and N1 rocket test
- Zond L1S-2
  - Launched 3 July 1969
  - First stage failure. The Zond capsule was recovered.
  - Attempted Lunar orbiter and N1 rocket test
- Zond 7
  - Launched 7 August 1969
  - Lunar flyby 11 August 1969
  - Returned to Earth 14 August 1969
  - Zond 7 carried four turtles.
- Zond 8
  - Launched 20 October 1970
  - Lunar flyby 24 October 1970
  - Returned to Earth 27 October 1970
- Zond 9
  - Planned but cancelled. Planned for July 1969, carrying a crew of Pavel Popovich and Vitali Sevastyanov, but never flew.
- Zond 10
  - Planned but cancelled

== See also ==
- Zond failed missions
- List of missions to the Moon
