= Ullage motor =

Small rocket engines that help fuel settle in 0g before main engine start

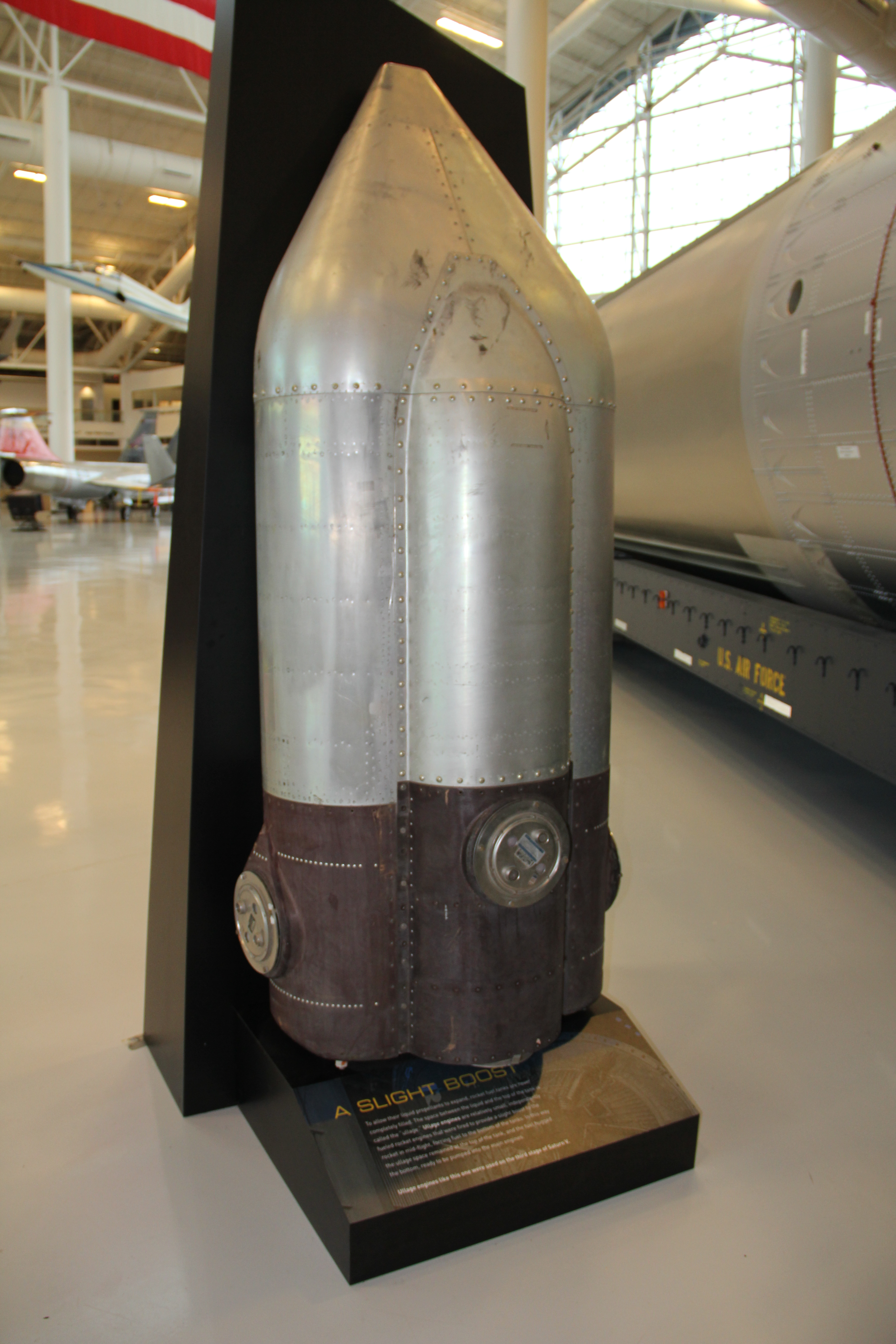
This Saturn IB second-stage Auxiliary Propulsion Unit is similar to one used on the Saturn V third stage, which performed as an ullage engine for translunar injection.

Ullage motors (also known as ullage engines or ullage rockets) are relatively small, independently fueled rocket engines that may be fired prior to main engine ignition, when the vehicle is in a zero-g situation. The resulting acceleration causes liquid in the rocket's main tanks to settle towards the aft end, ensuring uninterrupted flow to the fuel and oxidizer pumps.

== Description ==
Cryogenic-liquid-fueled rockets keep their propellants in insulated tanks. These tanks are never completely filled to allow for expansion. In micro-gravity conditions the cryogenic liquids are without a free surface, and exist in a slushy state between solid, liquid, and gas. In this mixed state, ullage gases may be sucked into the engines, which is undesirable, as it displaces useful propellant, reduces efficiency, and may damage the engines.

Small rocket engines, called "ullage motors", are sometimes used to settle the propellant before main engine ignition to allow the formation of a temporary free surface (with a distinct boundary between liquid and gas states). These motors provide acceleration that moves the main engine liquid propellants to the bottom of their tanks ("bottom" in this usage always meaning relative to the alignment of the main motor the ullage motors are serving), so they can be pumped into the engine plumbing.

The firing of the ullage motors is used before engine reignition, during stage separation and/or stabilization of a rocket when there are brief reductions in acceleration which could allow the liquid propellant to float away from the engine intakes. Ullage motors are also commonly employed on deep-space missions where a liquid rocket needs to start a burn after traveling in micro-gravity.

To perform this ullage pre-acceleration, reaction control system (RCS) thrusters are sometimes used. Larger ullage motors can also use solid propellant, which makes them generally single-use.

== American operations ==
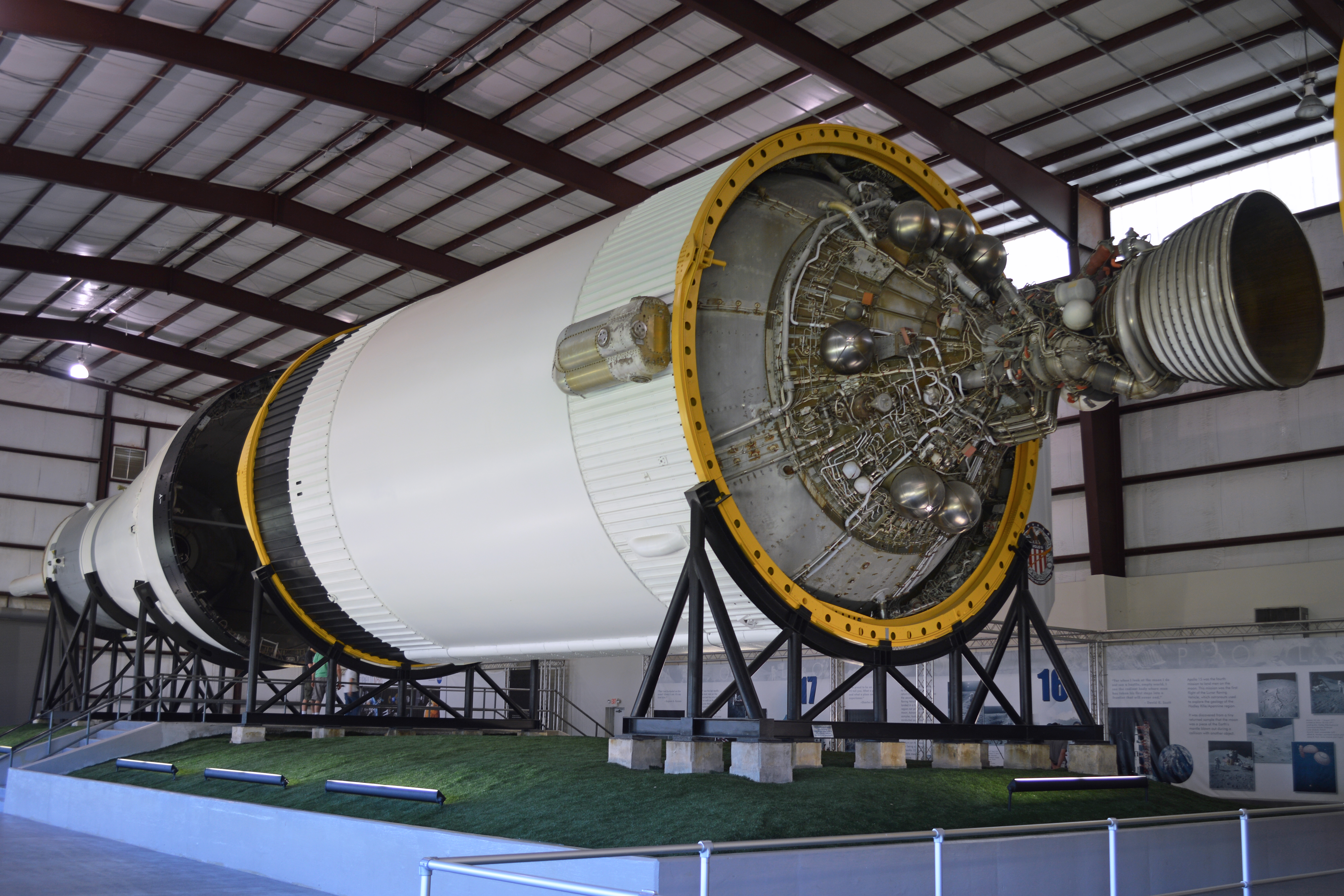
Ullage engine on the side of Saturn V third stage

Three sets of ullage motors are shown in this schematic of the Saturn V rocket

The Agena-A was one of the first vehicles to make use of an ullage system in preparation for ignition after separating from its Thor booster. Failure of the Agena's internal timer was also blamed for premature ignition of this ullage system in the failed launch of "Discoverer Zero" on January 21, 1959.

The second stage (S-II) of the Saturn V rocket used in the American Apollo program used four (originally eight) ullage motors located on the aft interstage skirt. In the S-IVB third stage, there was an Auxiliary Propulsion System that also had ullage functions. Ullage is often a secondary function of the reaction control system such as on the Apollo Lunar Module (LM). In his book Lost Moon, Jim Lovell recounted a description of a course-correction burn of the LEM's main descent engine to re-enter a free return trajectory to Earth during the successful recovery of the Apollo 13 capsule:

When the ship had stabilized in the proper attitude for firing, Lovell would deploy the LEM's landing gear, extending its four spidery legs to get them out of the way of the descent engine. Next the computer, relying on other instructions Haise typed into it, would fire four of Aquarius's attitude jets for 7.5 seconds. This procedure, known as ullage, was intended to jolt the spacecraft slightly forward and force the descent engine fuel to the bottom of its tanks, eliminating bubbles and air pockets. After that, the main descent engine would ignite automatically firing at 10 percent thrust for 5 seconds.

== Soviet/Russian operations ==
Ullage motors were used by Soviet engineers for the Molniya interplanetary launch vehicle in 1960.

Russian Proton rockets use ullage motors called SOZ motors. These are prone to explode years after end of operations, contributing to space debris. So far, 54 such SOZ motors have exploded in orbit.

== Indian operations ==
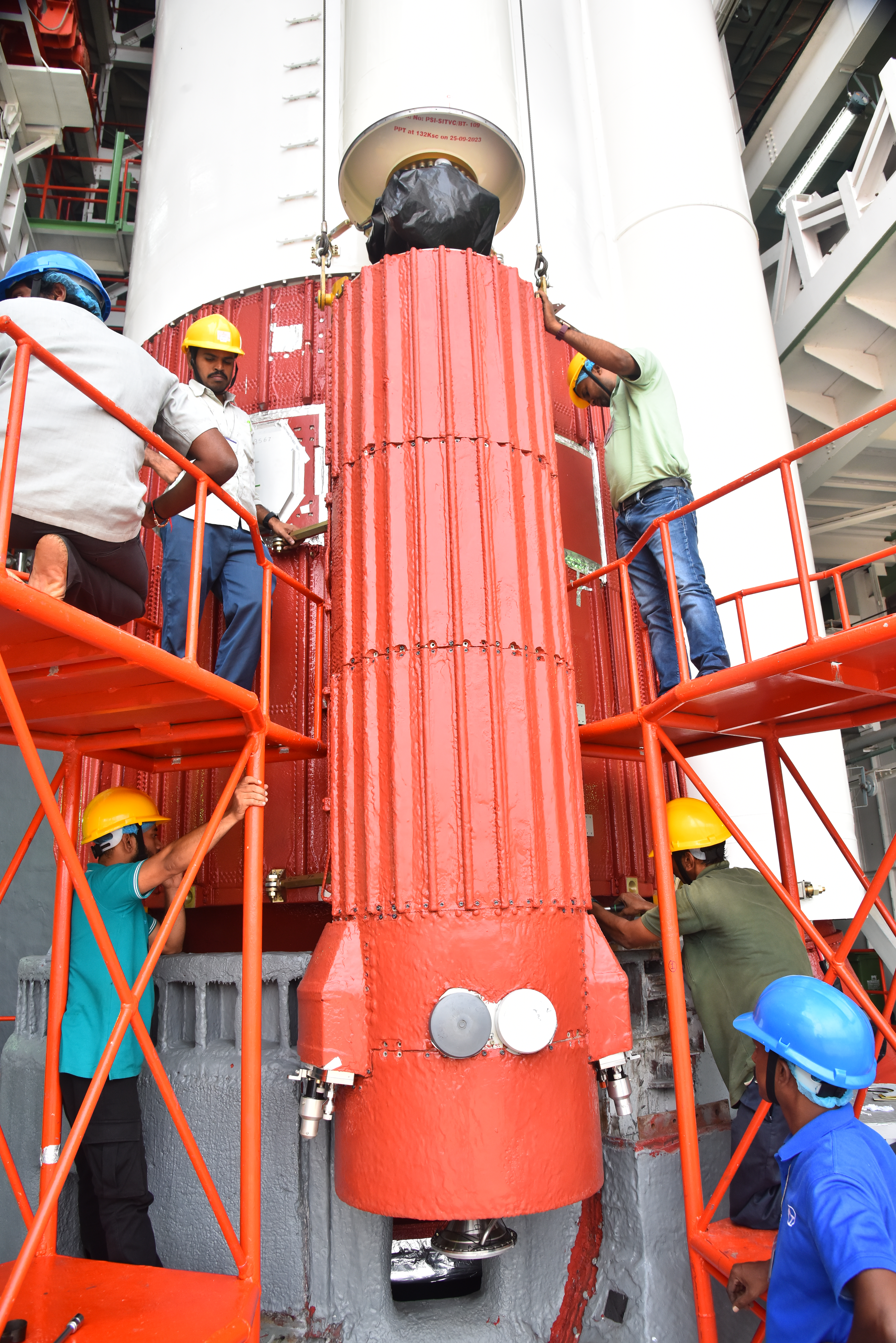
PSLV Ullage motors and SITVAC controls

The PSLV rocket has integrated ullage motors in between its alternate solid and liquid stages, with 12 on the first stage, eight on the second, and four on the final two stages.
