= Zond 8 =

1970 Soviet test spaceflight to the Moon

- A drawing of Zond 8 spacecraft.
- Mission type: Spacecraft test
- Operator: TsKBEM
- COSPAR ID: 1970-088A
- SATCAT no.: 4591
- Mission duration: 7 days

Spacecraft properties
- Spacecraft: Soyuz 7K-L1 s/n 14
- Spacecraft type: Uncrewed version
- Bus: Soyuz 7K-L1
- Manufacturer: OKB-1
- Launch mass: 5,375 kg

Start of mission
- Launch date: 20 October 1970; 19:55:39 UTC
- Rocket: Proton-K / Blok D
- Launch site: Baikonur Cosmodrome; Site 81/23
- Contractor: OKB-1

End of mission
- Recovered by: Soviet recovery vessel Taman
- Recovery date: 27 October 1970 (Indian Ocean)
- Landing date: 27 October 1970, 13:55 GMT
- Landing site: Chagos Archipelago (730 km at SE)

Orbital parameters
- Reference system: Geocentric
- Regime: Circumlunar

Flyby of Moon
- Closest approach: 24 October 1970
- Distance: 1110 km

Zond 8, also known as L-1 No.14, was the last in the series of circumlunar spacecraft, a member of the Soviet Zond program, designed to rehearse a piloted circumlunar flight, an uncrewed version of Soyuz 7K-L1 crewed circumlunar flight spacecraft. The project was initiated in 1965 to compete with the Americans in the race to the Moon but lost its importance once three astronauts orbited the Moon on the Apollo 8 mission in December 1968.

== Mission ==
Zond 8 was launched on 20 October 1970, at 19:55:39 GMT by a Proton-K / Blok D launcher from Site 81/23 of the Baikonur Cosmodrome, towards the Moon. Zond 8 had a mass of 5,375 kilograms (11,850 lb). The announced objectives of Zond 8 were investigations of the Moon and circumlunar space and testing of onboard systems and units.

The spacecraft obtained photographs of Earth on 21 October from a distance of 64,480 kilometres (40,070 mi). After a mid-course correction on 22 October 1970 at a distance of 250,000 kilometres (160,000 mi) from Earth, the spacecraft transmitted flight images of Earth for three days. Zond 8 reached the Moon without any apparent problems, circling its target on 24 October at a range of 1,110 kilometres (690 mi) and took both black-and-white and color photographs of the lunar surface during two separate sessions. The minimum distance from the Moon during the mission was 1,120 kilometres (696 miles) from the lunar surface. Scientific measurements were also obtained during the flight.

After two mid-course corrections on the return leg, Zond 8 achieved a return trajectory over Earth's northern hemisphere instead of the standard southern approach profile, allowing Soviet ground control stations to maintain near-continuous contact with the craft. The guidance system, however, malfunctioned on the return leg, and the spacecraft performed a simple ballistic (instead of a guided) reentry into Earth's atmosphere. The reentry was different from other reentries in the Zond program as it went over the north pole and landed in the Indian Ocean.

Zond 8 descent module reentered the Earth's atmosphere and splashed down safely in the Indian Ocean at 13:55 GMT on 27 October 1970 at 730 kilometres (450 mi) southeast of the Chagos Islands, 24 kilometres (15 mi) from its original target point. The USSR recovery ship Taman was on hand to collect it and bring it back to Moscow.

The Soviet Kremlin officials finally decided to cancel the L1 project in 1970.

=== Scientific instruments ===
- Imaging system
- Solar wind collector packages

== Zond 9 ==
Zond 9, Soyuz 7K-L1 s/n 10, was planned but cancelled. Zond 9 was planned to launch in July 1969, carrying a crew of Pavel Popovich and Vitali Sevastyanov, but never flew.

== Zond 10 ==
Zond 10, Soyuz 7K-L1 s/n 15, was planned but cancelled.

== See also ==
- Splashdown (spacecraft landing)
- Timeline of artificial satellites and space probes
