= Zond 4 =

1968 Soviet test spaceflight

- Names: Soyuz 7K-L1 s/n 6
- Mission type: Lunar flyby Spacecraft test
- Operator: OKB-1
- COSPAR ID: 1968-013A
- SATCAT no.: 03134

Spacecraft properties
- Bus: Soyuz 7K-L1
- Manufacturer: OKB-1
- Launch mass: 4,425 kilograms (9,755 lb)
- Dimensions: 4.5 m x 2.2 m x 2.72 m

Start of mission
- Launch date: 2 March 1968, 18:29:23 UTC
- Rocket: Proton-K/D
- Launch site: Baikonur 81/6

End of mission
- Disposal: deorbited/destroyed
- Decay date: 9 March 1968

Orbital parameters
- Reference system: Geocentric
- Regime: Elliptical orbit
- Perigee altitude: 200 kilometres (120 mi)
- Apogee altitude: 400,000 kilometres (250,000 mi)
- Inclination: 51.53°

Zond 4, part of the Soviet Zond program and an uncrewed version of Soyuz 7K-L1 crewed Moon-flyby spacecraft, was one of the first Soviet experiments towards crewed circumlunar spaceflight. It was launched to test the spaceworthiness of the new capsule and to gather data about flights in circumterrestrial space. It was the first Soviet spacecraft to possess a computer, the 34 kg Argon 11.

The spacecraft was successfully launched by a Proton K/D rocket on 2 March 1968 into a 400,000 km apogee orbit 180 degrees away from the Moon. Because of the malfunction that occurred during the previous L1 attempt, the launch team felt they needed camera coverage of the first/second stage separation. Two An-12 and one Tu-124 aircraft were sent to observe the rocket. The pilots watched it emerge from clouds and the staging sequence take place. The Proton performed flawlessly and inserted the L1 spacecraft into a parking orbit. The Blok D restart burn worked properly and the L1 was on its way. The Soviet news agency TASS officially announced the mission as Zond 4 to connect it with the previous, unrelated series of Zond planetary probes and obfuscate its true purpose. It was merely described as a mission to investigate "near Earth space and test new spacecraft systems." It was launched away from the Moon probably to avoid trajectory complications with lunar gravity. When the first course correction burn was to take place, the 100K star tracker malfunctioned, preventing Zond 4 from being properly oriented. The medium density light filter was switched on and the 15 second burn was carried out successfully. It was planned for the descent module to reenter the Earth's atmosphere at a shallow angle and "skip" back out, followed by a second reentry. This was to reduce g-loads on the spacecraft during descent. However, telemetry indicated up to 20 gs during reentry. After the radio blackout during reentry, the APO destruct system automatically blew up the capsule at 10 to 15 km altitude, 180–200 km off the African coast at Guinea--the reentry track had the potential to take Zond 4 to various landing points from Africa to Iran and in all of these cases the APO would blow the descent module up. The ultimate cause of the failure was malfunction of the star tracker, preventing Zond 4 from being oriented correctly. The Soviet state media made no announcement of Zond 4's return, leaving Western observers to speculate what happened and what the mission's exact purpose was since it had been launched away from the Moon, although they did eventually conclude that it was part of the Zond circumlunar program. Theories were that it went into heliocentric orbit, remained in an eccentric Earth orbit, the recovery failed for some reason, or even that it landed in China.

The Zond 4 flight was in some ways similar to the American Apollo 4 and 6 missions as they were uncrewed test flights in highly elliptical Earth orbits.
