= Soyuz 7K-L1 =

Soviet spacecraft for crewed lunar flyby

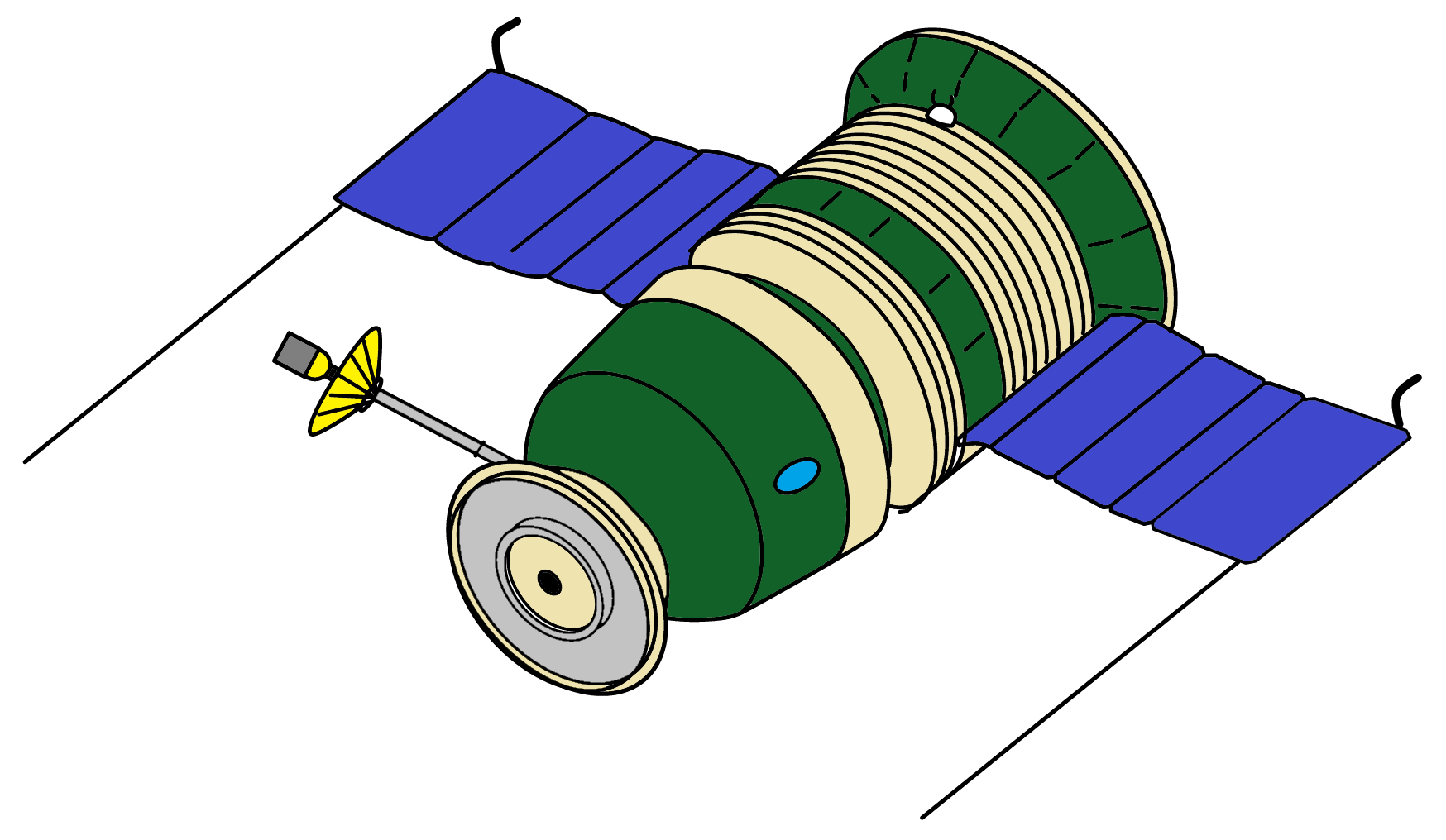
- Manufacturer: OKB-1
- Country of origin: Soviet Union
- Applications: Carry cosmonauts around the Moon and back to Earth

Production
- Status: Cancelled programme
- Built: 15
- Launched: 12
- Retired: 3

Related spacecraft
- Derived from: Soyuz 7K-OK
- Derivatives: Soyuz 7K-LOK

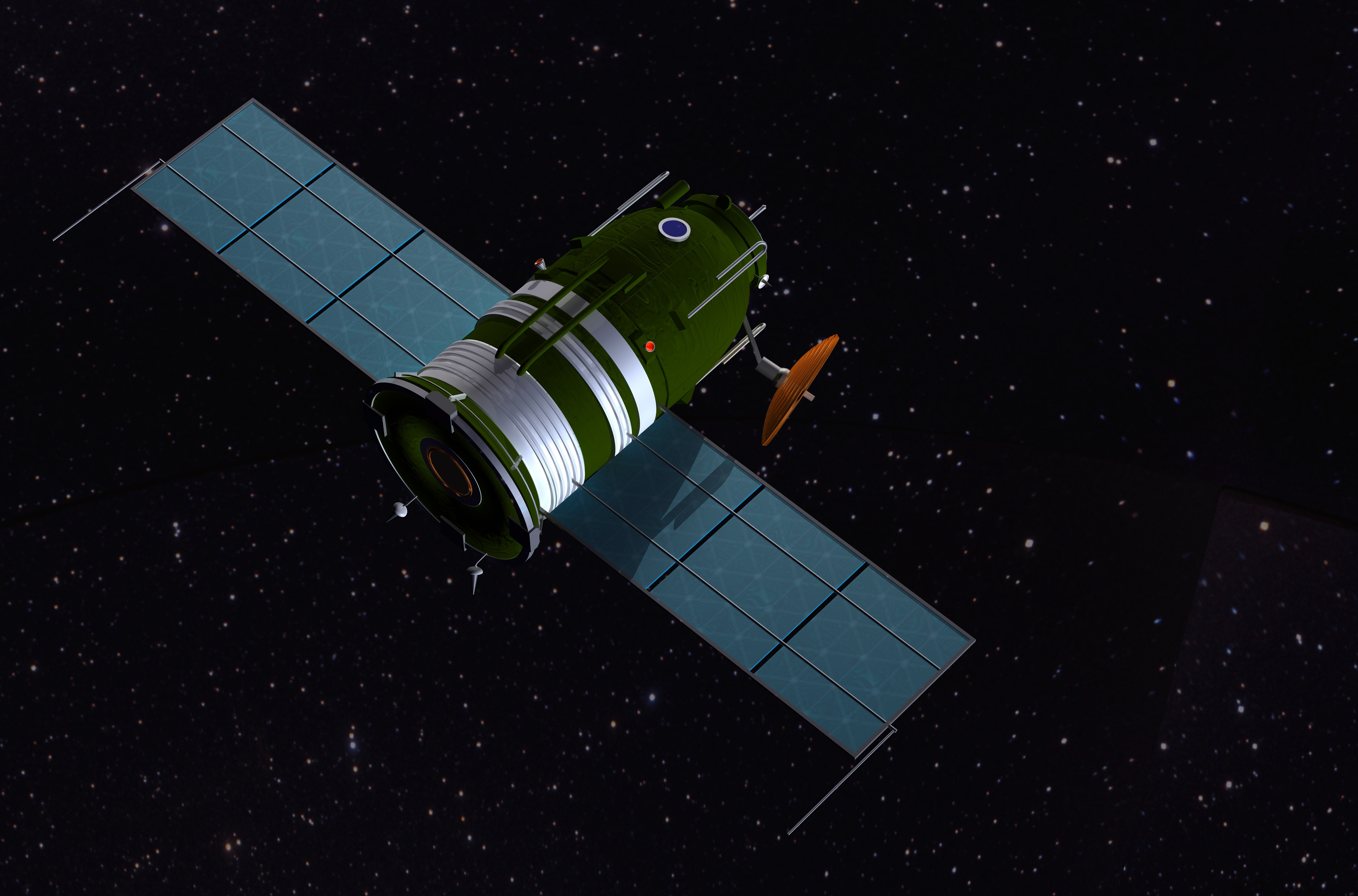
An artist's impression of the Soyuz 7K-L1 en route to the Moon.

The Soyuz 7K-L1 "Zond" spacecraft was designed to launch cosmonauts from the Earth to circle the Moon without going into lunar orbit in the context of the Soviet crewed Moon-flyby program in the Moon race. It was based on the Soyuz 7K-OK. Several modifications reduced vehicle mass and increased circumlunar capability. The most notable modifications were the replacement of the orbital module with a support cone and a high-gain parabolic antenna, the removal of a reserve parachute, and the addition of the gyro platform and star navigation sensors for the far space navigation. The spacecraft was capable of carrying two cosmonauts. At the start of flight testing, there were serious reliability problems with the new Proton rocket, the 7K-L1, and the Soyuz 7K-OK that the L1 was based on.

== History ==
Chief Designer Sergei Korolev had originally envisioned a crewed lunar spacecraft launched in pieces by R-7 boosters and assembled in Earth orbit. The development of Vladimir Chelomei's large UR-500 booster theoretically made it possible to do the job in a single launch. However, Chelomei also proposed his own, competing for lunar spacecraft, the LK-1, and Soviet premier Nikita Khrushchev gave his approval in August 1964. Two months later, Khrushchev was expelled from power and Chelomei lost his principal patron. At the end of the year, Korolev revived his proposal for the Soyuz spacecraft but concealed his true intentions by billing it as an Earth orbital vehicle for testing rendezvous and docking maneuvers. In October 1965, a mere three months before his death, Korolev was granted official approval for developing a crewed lunar spacecraft, which would be a modified Soyuz. This would be launched towards the Moon on a UR-500 topped with the Blok D stage under development by the OKB-1 Bureau.

Korolev originally intended to piece together the lunar Soyuz in Earth orbit because he did not believe the UR-500 was powerful enough to launch the full vehicle or that it wouldn't be safe for the crew. However, when he died in January 1966, his successor as head of OKB-1, Vasily Mishin, argued that it was definitely possible to strip down the Soyuz enough to launch it with the UR-500.

With the first four uncrewed test starts (see below) being partially successful or unsuccessful, including two under the common open name "Kosmos" as for any Soviet test spacecraft, the mission of 2–7 March 1968 and subsequent ones were the flights of the L1 spacecraft under the open designation "Zond" that were given by Soviets for test missions to far space.

After the successful United States Apollo 8 crewed flight around the Moon, the Soviet crewed Moon-flyby missions lost political motivation. The first crewed flight of the L1/Zond spacecraft with Alexei Leonov and Valery Bykovsky planned for the end of 1970 was cancelled. In addition, the Proton booster was far from being human-rated and its poor launch record made it undesirable for crewed flights.

All L1/Zond spacecraft made only uncrewed flights from 1967 to 1970, from (Zond 4 to Zond 8), and four of these five Zond flights suffered malfunctions. Test flights conducted around the Moon showed problems using their star sensors for navigation. These problems caused ballistic reentry due to failed guidance. One direct descent re-entry was performed on a steep ballistic trajectory with a deceleration of up to 20 Gs and splashed down in the Indian Ocean. Three others performed a maneuver known as "skip reentry" to shed velocity. One of those also performed an unsafe (for humans) descent of up to 20 Gs of deceleration, the other suffered main parachute failure, and only one flight - Zond 7 - would have been safe for cosmonauts.

Instrumentation flown on these missions gathered data on micrometeor flux, solar and cosmic rays, magnetic fields, radio emissions, and solar wind. Many photographs were taken and biological payloads were also flown. Zond 5 was the first spacecraft to carry a group of terrestrial creatures (tortoises being the most complex) on a circumlunar flight and return them relatively safely to Earth. Zond 5 splashed down in the Indian Ocean after descending steeply with a 20 G deceleration rate. Although unsafe for humans, these high Gs apparently didn't affect the tortoises' health, and they were reportedly able to breed afterward.

Two modifications of main Soyuz 7K-L1 "Zond" version was created: the powered (up to 7000 kg mass) Soyuz 7K-L1S "Zond-M" that were failed attempted to launch for Moon flyby on N1 rocket two times due to Soyuz 7K-LOK orbital ship-module of L3 lunar expedition complex was not ready; the Soyuz 7K-L1E "Zond-LOK" as dummy mockup of Soyuz 7K-LOK and were successfully launched on Low Earth Orbit on Proton rocket as Kosmos 382 and failed launched for Moon orbiting on third N1 rocket.

No official name for crewed Soyuz 7K-L1 "Zond" was adopted. According to Mishin's and Kamanin's memoirs, the names "Rodina" (motherland), "Ural" (Ural mountains), "Akademik Korolyov" (academician Korolyov). Also, "Zarya" (dawn) and "Znamya" (banner) were proposed for both lunar Soyuz 7K-L1 flyby and Soyuz 7K-LOK orbital ships. The information display systems (IDS) on the L1 was called "Saturn" and featured some differences from the standard 7K-OK "Sirius-7K" IDS.

Along with the remaining 7K-L1S, the Soviet Moon-flyby program was closed in 1970 without the achievement of its crewed primary goal. The intended crewed use of L1/Zond spacecraft was documented in official Soviet sources for the first time but from 1968 until 1989 this and the Moon-landing N1-L3 programs were classified and the Soviet government denied the existence of both. Near 1968 a rare open Soviet source (Big Soviet Encyclopedia's Yearbook, Kosmonavtika small encyclopedia) sporadically referred to Zonds as tests of space ships for lunar missions in contrast to the space apparate term used by the Soviets for spacecraft not capable of carrying a crew.

== Planned schedule ==
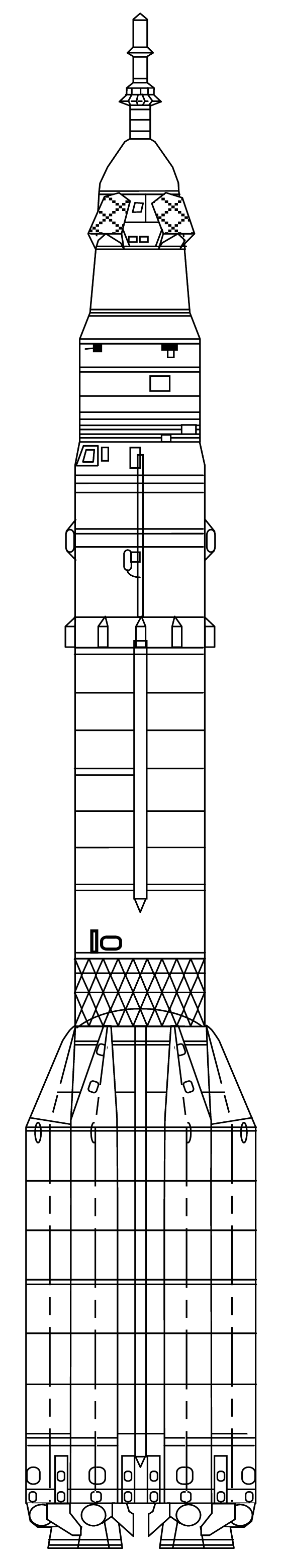
Proton 7K-L1 launch vehicle configuration

As of 1967, the Soyuz 7K-L1 launch schedule was:

Mission

- 2P - Develop Blok D stage - March 1967
- 3P - Develop Blok D stage - March 1967
- 4L - Uncrewed lunar flyby - May 1967 (actually launched on 27 September 1967, booster failure)
- 5L - Uncrewed lunar flyby - June 1967 (actually launched on 22 November 1967, booster failure)
- 6L - Crewed lunar flyby - June or July 1967
- 7L and 8L - Crewed lunar flybys - August 1967 (7L actually launched on 23 April 1968, as Zond 1968A, booster failure; 8L actually launched on 21 July 1968, booster explosion)
- 9L and 10L - Crewed lunar flybys - September 1967 (10L planned to launch as Zond 9, cancelled)
- 11L and 12L - Crewed lunar flybys - October 1967
- 13L - Reserve spacecraft (actually launched on 20 January 1969, as Zond 1969A, booster failure)

In July 1968, it was proposed that L1 spacecraft would be launched every month, and the first crewed mission would be in December 1968 or January 1969 after 3 or 4 successful uncrewed flights. In December 1968, dates for three crewed L1 missions were set to March, May, and July 1969. Finally, in September 1969 one crewed L1 mission was formally set for April 1970.

== Built spacecraft ==
Fifteen Soyuz 7K-L1 were built:

- s/n 1 - prototype not equipped with heat shield, intended to perfect orbital operation of the spacecraft without recovery of the capsule.
- s/n 2 - prototype not equipped with heat shield, intended to perfect orbital operation of the spacecraft without recovery of the capsule. Launched on 10 March 1967 as Cosmos 146.
- s/n 3 - launched on 8 April 1967 as Cosmos 154.
- s/n 4 - launched on 27 September 1967, as Zond 1967A, booster failure.
- s/n 5 - launched on 22 November 1967, as Zond 1967B, booster failure.
- s/n 6 - launched on 2 March 1968 as Zond 4.
- s/n 7 - launched on 23 April 1968, as Zond 1968A, destroyed.
- s/n 8 - launched on 21 July 1968, destroyed.
- s/n 9 - launched on 14 September 1968 as Zond 5. The return capsule is on display at the Energia Museum, in Russia.
- s/n 10 - planned to launch as Zond 9, cancelled.
- s/n 11 - launched as Zond 7. The return capsule is on display at Orevo, Russia.
- s/n 12 - launched on 10 November 1968, as Zond 6, returned to Earth on 17 November 1968.
- s/n 13 - launched on 20 January 1969, as Zond 1969A, failure, capsule recovered.
- s/n 14 - launched on 20 October 1970, as Zond 8, returned to Earth on 27 October 1970.
- s/n 15 - planned to launch as Zond 10, cancelled.

== Test missions ==
- Cosmos 146 (Soyuz 7K-L1 s/n 1)
  - Launched on 10 March 1967
  - Prototype Soyuz 7K-L1P launched by Proton into a planned highly elliptical Earth orbit.
- Cosmos 154 (Soyuz 7K-L1 s/n 3)
  - Launched on 8 April 1967
  - Prototype Soyuz 7K-L1P launched by Proton and failed into a planned translunar trajectory.
- Zond 1967A (Soyuz 7K-L1 s/n 4)
  - Launched on 27 September 1967
  - First stage - 1 x RD-253 failed, resulting in at T+67 seconds in deviation from the flight path.
- Zond 1967B (Soyuz 7K-L1 s/n 5)
  - Launched on 22 November 1967
  - Second stage - 1 x RD-210 failure, shutoff of stage 4 seconds after ignition. Launcher crashed downrange.
- Zond 4 (Soyuz 7K-L1 s/n 6)
  - Launched on 2 March 1968
  - Study of remote regions of circumterrestrial space, development of new on-board systems and units of space stations.
  - Returned to Earth on 7 March 1968 - Self-destruct system automatically blew up the capsule at 10 to 15 km altitude, 180–200 km off the African coast at Guinea.
- Zond 1968A (Soyuz 7K-L1 s/n 7)
  - Launched on 23 April 1968
  - Second stage failed 260 seconds after launch.
  - Attempted Lunar flyby.
- Zond 1968B (Zond 7K-L1 s/n 8)
  - Launched on 21 July 1968
  - Blok D stage exploded on the pad, killing three people.
- Zond 5 (Soyuz 7K-L1 s/n 5)
  - Launched on 15 September 1968
  - Circumlunar on 18 September 1968. The first Moon mission to include animals.
  - Returned to on 21 Earth September 1968.
- Zond 6 (Soyuz 7K-L1 s/n 12)
  - Launched on 10 November 1968
  - Circumlunar on 14 November 1968
  - Returned to Earth on 17 November 1968 but crashed due to a parachute failure.
- Zond 1969A (Soyuz 7K-L1 s/n 13)
  - Launched on 20 January 1969 (planned 8 December 1968)
  - Stage two shut down 25 seconds early. Automatic flight abort. The capsule was safely recovered.
  - Attempted Lunar flyby (planned first crewed flight before Apollo 8).
- Zond-M 1
  - Launched on 21 February 1969
  - First stage failure. The capsule escape system fired 70 seconds after launch. The capsule was recovered.
  - Attempted Lunar orbiter and N1 rocket test.
- Zond-M 2
  - Launched on 3 July 1969
  - First stage failure. The Zond capsule was recovered.
  - Attempted Lunar orbiter and N1 rocket test.
- Zond 7 (Soyuz 7K-L1 s/n 11)
  - Launched on 7 August 1969
  - Lunar flyby on 11 August 1969
  - Returned to Earth on 14 August 1969.
- Zond 8 (Soyuz 7K-L1 s/n 14)
  - Launched on 20 October 1970
  - Lunar flyby on 24 October 1970
  - Returned to Earth on 27 October 1970.
- Zond 9 (Soyuz 7K-L1 s/n 10)
  - Planned but cancelled.
- Zond 10 (Soyuz 7K-L1 s/n 15)
  - Planned but cancelled.
