= Circumlunar trajectory =

Type of free-return trajectory

The trajectory followed by Apollo 13

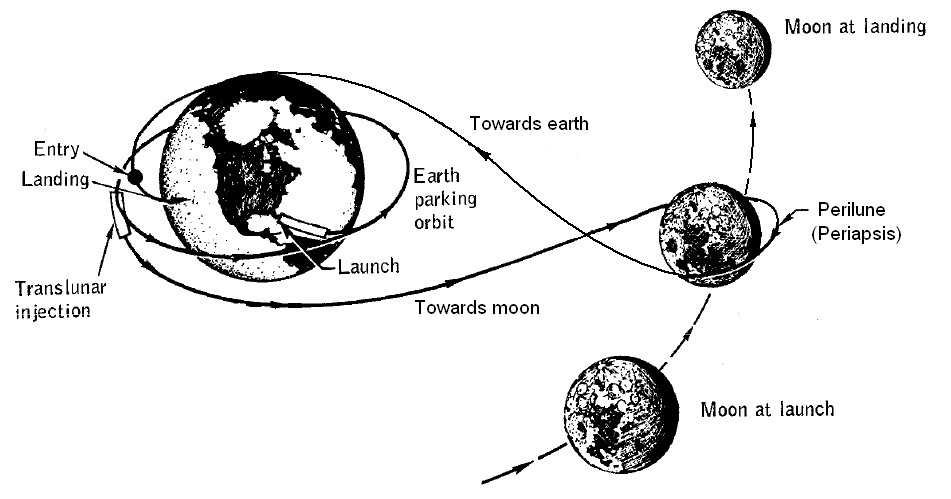
Sketch of a circumlunar free return trajectory (not to scale).

In orbital mechanics, a circumlunar trajectory, trans-lunar trajectory or lunar free return is a type of free return trajectory which takes a spacecraft from Earth, around the far side of the Moon, and back to Earth using only gravity once the initial trajectory is set.

Comparison of free-return trajectories from the Earth to the Moon, not to scale, viewed from the north in inertial coordinates and the Moon is shown where it is at the moment of closest approach by the spacecraft.

== History ==
The first spacecraft to fly a circumlunar trajectory was Luna 3. Circumlunar trajectories were also used by Apollo missions prior to lunar orbit insertion, to provide a free return to Earth in the event of a propulsion system malfunction on the way to the Moon. This was used on Apollo 13, when an oxygen tank rupture necessitated return to Earth without firing the Service Module engine, although a number of course corrections using the Lunar Module descent engine were used to refine the trajectory.

A number of proposed, but not flown, crewed missions have been planned to intentionally conduct circumlunar flybys, including the Soviet Soyuz 7K-L1 or Zond programme, and several US proposals, including Gemini-Centaur and an early Apollo proposal.

The latest circumlunar mission is 2026 NASA Artemis II.

== See also ==
- Free-return trajectory
- Trans-lunar injection
- List of missions to the Moon
