= Zond L1S-1 =

Soviet robotic spacecraft of 1969

- Mission type: Lunar orbiter; Rocket test
- Mission duration: 66 seconds
- Distance travelled: 30 km
- Range: 32-35 km
- Apogee: 30 km

Start of mission
- Launch date: 21 February 1969, 09:18 UTC
- Rocket: N1/No.3L
- Launch site: Site 110P

Zond L1S-1 was a Zond capsule to be placed into orbit around the Moon by the first launch of the N1, a Soviet-made super heavy-lift launch vehicle designed to land crewed Soviet spacecraft on the Moon. The Zond capsule was equipped with a dummy lander and cameras to photograph the lunar surface for possible sites of a crewed landing. The failure of the N1 launch vehicle caused the launch escape system to ignite, saving the Zond capsule from destruction.

== History ==
Engines 12 and 24 shut down about 3 to 7 seconds after liftoff. The fault was found to be an error in the control system. The control system compensated by giving more power to the working engines. But at 25 seconds after lift off, the control system throttled back the working engines, as there was too much vibration. At an altitude of about 30 km, just 66 seconds after liftoff, the engines again were set to full power. This caused an oxidizer pipe to break open. A fire started, and the engine's turbopumps exploded.

Zond L1S-2 launched on 3 July 1969 also failed. Soyuz 7K-L1E No.1 launched on 26 June 1971 failed. The last N-1 launch of Soyuz 7K-LOK No.1 failed on 23 November 1972.

== Launches ==
Flight number	Date (UTC)	Launch site	Serial no.	Payload	Outcome	Remarks
1	21 February 1969; 09:18:07	Baikonur Site 110/38	3L	Zond L1S-1	Failure	
2	3 July 1969; 20:18:32	Baikonur Site 110/38	5L	Zond L1S-2	Failure	Destroyed launch pad 110 East
3	26 June 1971; 23:15:08	Baikonur Site 110/37	6L	Soyuz 7K-L1E No.1	Failure	
4	23 November 1972; 06:11:55	Baikonur Site 110/37	7L	Soyuz 7K-LOK No.1	Failure	

== See also ==
- N1 (rocket)
- Soyuz Kontakt
