= Baikonur Cosmodrome Site 250 =

Site 250
- Launch site: Baikonur Cosmodrome
- Location: 46.0083°N 63.3049°E
Launch history
- Status: Inactive
- Launches: 1
- First launch: 15 May 1987
- Last launch: 15 May 1987
- Associated rockets: Energia; Angara (future)

Site 250 at the Baikonur Cosmodrome, also known as UKSS (Russian: Универсальный Комплекс Стенд-Старт, lit. 'Universal Complex Stand-Start') and Bayterek (Russian: Байтерек), is a test facility and launch site which was used by the Energia rocket during the 1980s. The site consists of a single launch pad, which doubled as a test stand, and is supported by an engineering area and a propellant storage facility. As of 2011 the complex was planned to be rebuilt as the Bayterek Launch Complex, which would be used by the Angara rocket from 2015; however development is yet to begin.

Today the UKSS at Site 250 is still standing, however it is deteriorating. Construction work for Bayterek is yet to begin.

== Energia ==
Site 250 was built in the late 1970s as the Universal Complex Stand-Start (UKSS) to support Energia development, and unlike other Soviet launch complexes it was designed to support long-duration static tests as well as launches, after Valentin Glushko blamed the failure of the N1 programme on the lack of facilities to perform static tests. The only launch to have taken place from Site 250 was the maiden flight of the Energia rocket, carrying the Polyus spacecraft, which occurred on 15 May 1987. Energia was abandoned after just two launches, the other of which took place from Site 110.

== Angara ==
Following the cancellation of the Energia programme Site 250 fell out of use. In 2008 Site 250 was selected for development of an Angara launch complex at Baikonur, the Bayterek Launch Complex, instead of Site 200/40 as had originally been planned, and Site 110 which was also under consideration. This decision was officially confirmed in 2009.

Today the UKSS at Site 250 is still standing, however it is deteriorating. Construction work for Bayterek is yet to begin.
