= Molniya-1 No.2 =

First-generation Soviet communication satellite program

- Mission type: Communications
- Operator: Experimental Design Bureau (OKB-1)
- Mission duration: Failed to orbit 1.5 years (planned)

Spacecraft properties
- Spacecraft: Molniya-1 No.2
- Spacecraft type: Molniya
- Manufacturer: Experimental Design Bureau (OKB-1)
- Launch mass: 1422 kg

Start of mission
- Launch date: 4 June 1964, 04:00:00 GMT
- Rocket: Molniya 8K78 s/n G15000-18
- Launch site: Baikonur, Site 1
- Contractor: Experimental Design Bureau (OKB-1)

Orbital parameters
- Reference system: Geocentric orbit (planned)
- Regime: Molniya orbit
- Perigee altitude: 39,000 km
- Apogee altitude: 710 km
- Inclination: 65.0°
- Period: 720 minutes

Molniya-1 No.2, a 1,422 kg (3,135 lb) Molniya-1 satellite, was the first Soviet communications satellite to be launched. However, it failed to achieve orbit due to a malfunction of the rocket which was carrying it. It was intended to operate in a Molniya orbit, from where it would be used to demonstrate communications between parts of the USSR.

== Launch ==
Molniya-1 No.2 was launched at 04:00 GMT on 4 June 1964, atop a Molniya 8K78 launch vehicle, flying from Site 1 at the Baikonur Cosmodrome. A motor circuit in the servo controlling the core stage throttle failed 104 seconds into the flight, resulting in the throttle becoming jammed closed and the fuel supply to the engines being stopped.

Prior to the release of information about its mission, NASA had incorrectly identified the launch of Molniya-1 No.2 as a failed attempt to launch a Zond spacecraft on a circumlunar technology demonstration mission, and assigned it the placeholder designation Zond 1964A.
