= Transporter erector =

Ground system used to transport, raise, and launch missiles and launch vehicles

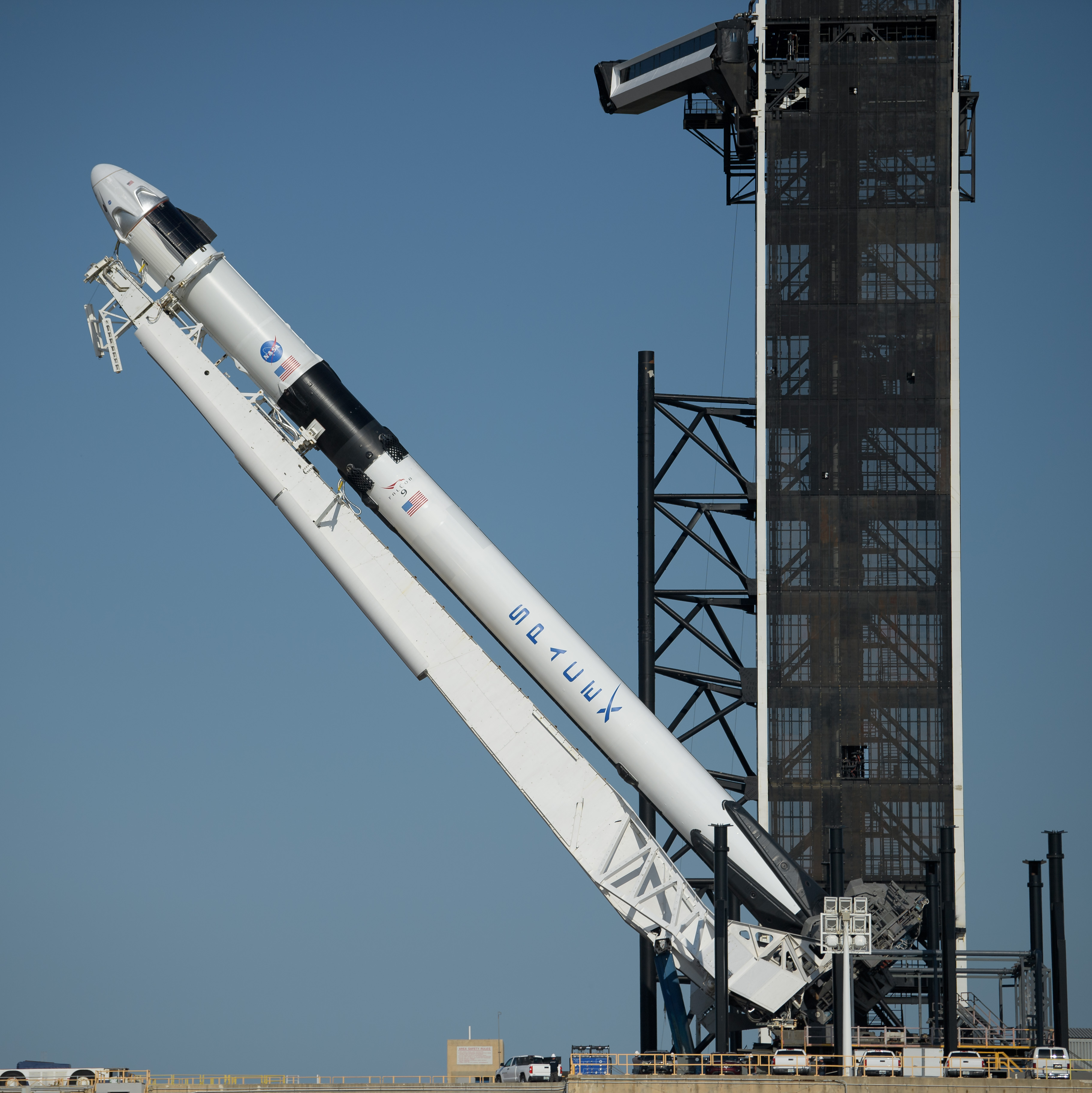
SpaceX transporter erector tilts a Falcon 9 rocket to its vertical position

A transporter erector (TE) is a mobile system used to move rocket and launch vehicle systems while horizontal on the ground, and can provide the motive force to bring the vehicle vertical prior to final preparation for launch.

== Examples and use ==
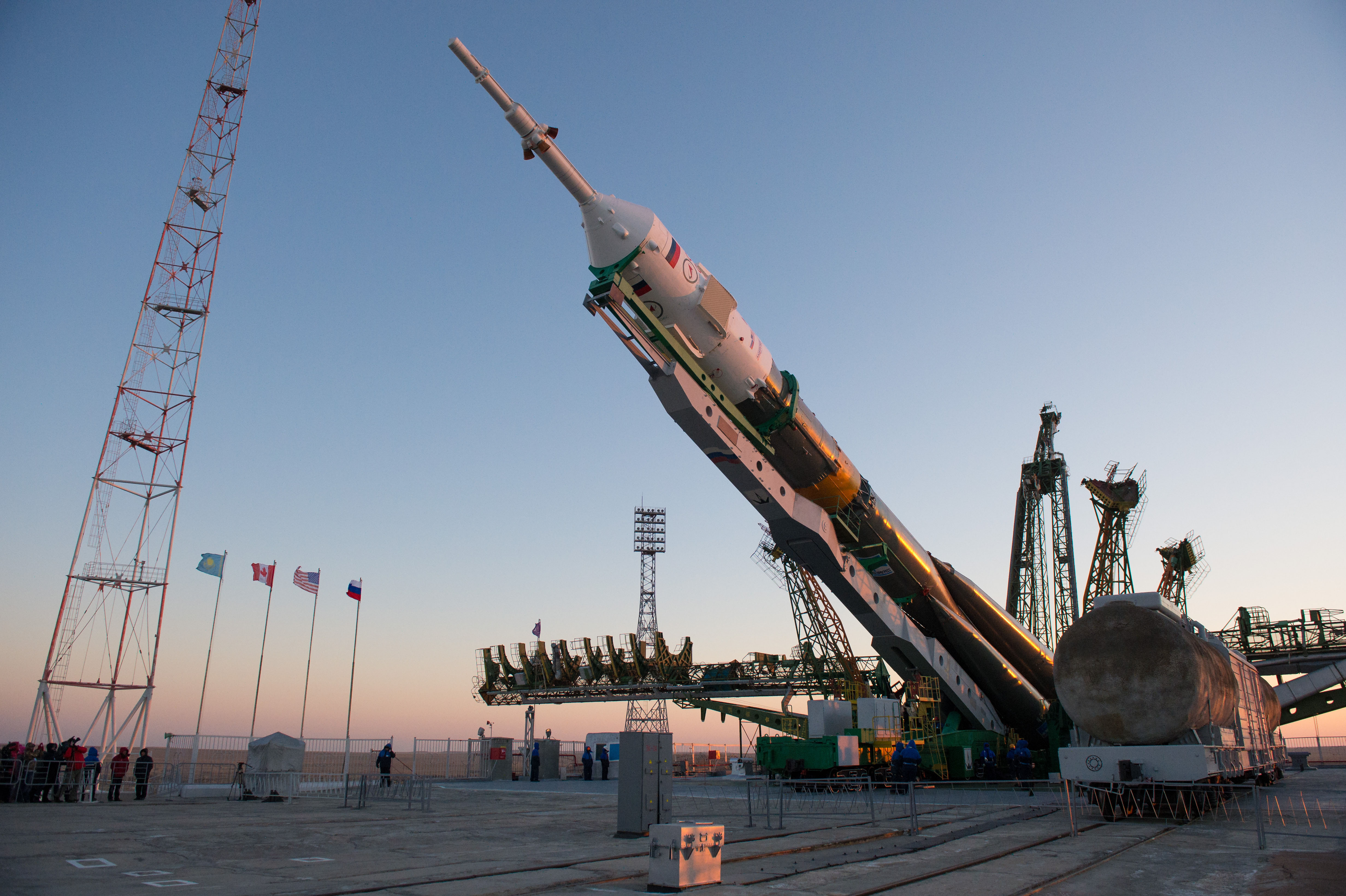
Soyuz TMA-07M being erected

The Soviet and Russian Soyuz launch vehicles use a transporter erector that rides on rails to move the rocket to the launch pad in a horizontal orientation. The aft end of the rocket is placed over the flame pit, and then it is rotated up to a vertical orientation, where arms swing in to secure the rocket. The transporter erector then backs away from the launch pad. The large Soviet N1 moon rocket also used a transporter erector for its four failed launch attempts.

The United States Air Force's Minuteman ICBM weapon system uses a transporter erector as a mobile system to emplace LGM-30 Minuteman missiles inside their protective launch facilities.

The American company SpaceX also uses transporter erectors to transport its Falcon 9 and Falcon Heavy rockets from its horizontal integration facilities to its launch pads in a horizontal orientation. The aft end of the rocket rides on rails, the front end is placed on wheels, and propulsion is provided by a large aviation-style pushback tug. Once in position, the rocket is rotated to a vertical orientation. SpaceX uses the central spine of the transporter erector as a strongback, restraining the rocket, providing stability until the tanks are pressurized with fuels, and contain the fluid hoses along with power and telemetry cables. Consequently, it remains at the launch pad through the launch and is typically tilted away 1.5° from the rocket just a few minutes prior to launch and 45° away from the rocket at the moment of liftoff.

== Variants ==
There are different types of transport erectors that use different methods of transportation or wheels. These can include rail, crawler tracks, or simple road wheels.

== See also ==
- Transporter erector launcher, for missiles
- LGM-30 Minuteman
