= Energia (rocket) =

Soviet launch vehicle

Energia Энергия
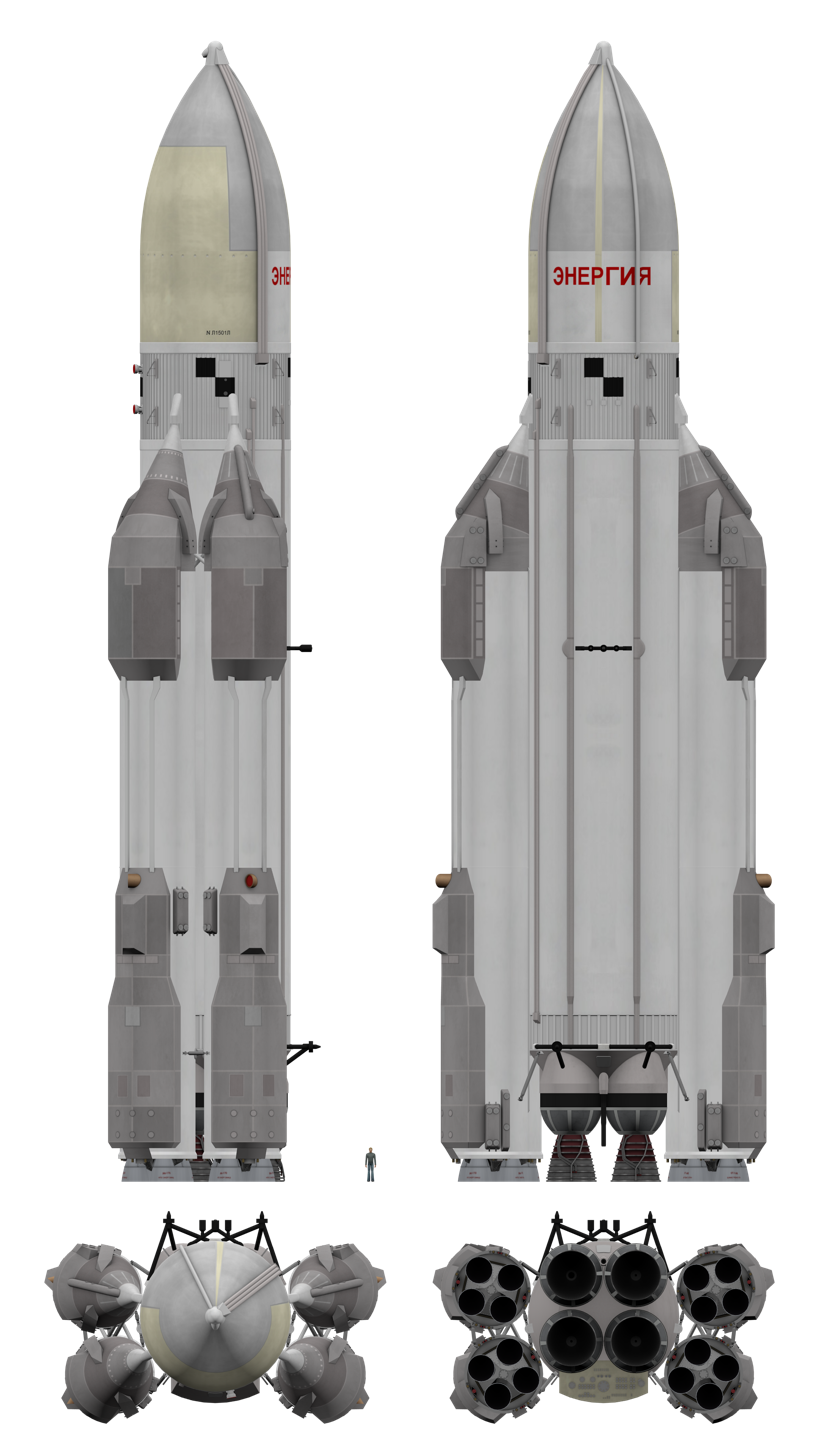
- Energia perspective free render with multiple angles and human (1.76 m) for scale.
- Function: Human-rated multi-purpose super heavy-lift launch vehicle
- Manufacturer: NPO "Energia"
- Country of origin: Soviet Union
- Cost per launch: US$764 million (1985) US$2.306 billion (2025)

Size
- Height: 58.765 m (192.80 ft)
- Diameter: 17.65 m (57.9 ft)
- Mass: 2,400,000 kg (5,300,000 lb)
- Stages: 2

Capacity

Payload to LEO
- Mass: 100,000 kg (220,000 lb)

Payload to GSO
- Mass: 20,000 kg (44,000 lb)

Payload to TLI
- Mass: 32,000 kg (71,000 lb)

Launch history
- Status: Retired
- Launch sites: Baikonur
- Total launches: 2
- Success(es): 2
- Failure: 0
- First flight: 15 May 1987
- Last flight: 15 November 1988

Boosters – Zenit
- No. boosters: 4
- Height: 39.46 m (129.5 ft)
- Diameter: 3.92 m (12.9 ft)
- Powered by: 1 RD-170
- Maximum thrust: 29,000 kN (6,500,000 lbf) sea level 32,000 kN (7,200,000 lbf) vacuum
- Specific impulse: 309 s (3.03 km/s) at sea level 338 s (3.31 km/s) in vacuum
- Burn time: 156 s
- Propellant: RP-1/LOX

Core stage
- Height: 58.765 m (192.80 ft)
- Diameter: 7.75 m (25.4 ft)
- Powered by: 4 RD-0120
- Maximum thrust: 5,800 kN (1,300,000 lbf) sea level 7,500 kN (1,700,000 lbf) vacuum
- Specific impulse: 359 s (3.52 km/s) at sea level 454 s (4.45 km/s) in vacuum
- Burn time: 480–500 s
- Propellant: LH_{2}/LOX

Energia (Russian: Энергия, romanized: Energiya, lit. 'Energy'; GRAU: 11K25, Sheldon: K-1, DoD: SL-17) was a 1980s super-heavy lift launch vehicle. It was designed by NPO Energia of the Soviet Union as part of the Buran programme for a variety of payloads including the Buran spacecraft. The Energia used four strap-on boosters, each powered by a four-chamber RD-170 engine burning kerosene/LOX, and a central core stage with four single-chamber RD-0120 (11D122) engines fueled by liquid hydrogen/LOX.

The Energia vehicle had two functionally different operational variants: Energia-Buran, in which a Buran-class orbiter was the payload and performed the final orbital insertion, and Buran-T, in which the payload was carried in a side-mounted cargo container and final insertion was performed either by the payload, an upper stage, or a space tug integrated into the container. During the first launch of the Energia, the vehicle carried the Polyus spacecraft in place of the cargo container; the operational Buran-T configuration with a container was never flown.

The launch vehicle had the capacity to place about 100 tonnes in Low Earth orbit, up to 20 tonnes to geostationary orbit and up to 32 tonnes by translunar trajectory into lunar orbit. The program was officially approved in 1976, following the cancellation of the unsuccessful N1 rocket designed for Soviet crewed lunar missions. Energia was the Soviet Union's first successful super-heavy lift launch vehicle, and the world's second, after the American Saturn V.

The Energia made just two flights before being discontinued, carrying Polyus in 1987 and the Buran orbiter in 1988. The RD-170 engine used on the vehicle's strap-on boosters was at the time the most powerful rocket engine to use liquid fuel, and scaled-down versions of the RD-170 have been used on a number of launch vehicles, with a dual-chamber derivative on the American Atlas III and Atlas V, and single-chamber derivatives on the Russian Angara rockets, the American Antares 200, and South Korean Naro-1.

== Development history ==
Work on the Energia-Buran system began in 1976 after the decision was made to cancel the unsuccessful N1 rocket. The facilities and infrastructure built for the N1 were reused for Energia (notably the horizontal assembly building at Site 112 of the Baikonur Cosmodrome), just as NASA reused infrastructure designed for the Saturn V in the Space Shuttle program. Energia also replaced the "Vulkan" concept, which was a design based on the Proton and using the same hypergolic propellants, but much larger and more powerful. The "Vulkan" designation was later given to a variation of the Energia which has eight boosters and multiple stages.

The Energia was conceived primarily as a launcher for Buran-class orbiters, and for that reason it was designed to carry its payload mounted on the side of the stack, rather than on top, as is done with most other launch vehicles. Alongside the Energia-Buran configuration, in which a Buran-class orbiter was the payload and performed the final orbital insertion, the vehicle fly in the Buran-T configuration, in which the payload was carried in a side-mounted cargo container and final insertion was performed either by the payload, an upper stage, or a space tug integrated into the container. During its first launch, Energia 6SL carried the Skif-DM (Polyus) spacecraft, a demonstrator for the then-in-development Skif orbital weapons platform.

Due to the termination of the wider Buran programme, the Energia programme was concluded after only two launches. The legacy of the project manifests itself in the RD-170 family of rocket engines, and the Zenit launcher, its first stage a close relative the Energia first-stage boosters.

== Description ==
=== Block A first stage ===
The first stage, Block A, was four strap-on boosters weighing in at 340 tons with fuel included. The boosters had a burn time of 156 seconds from takeoff. They used one RD-170 engine for each booster, four in total. Each booster was 40 meters (131.2 ft) tall and 3.9 meters (12.7 ft) wide. The stage used kerosene as fuel.

The boosters' thrust was 7,906.100 kN in a vacuum.

=== Block Ts second stage ===
The second stage, Block Ts, was the core/center stage of the rocket weighing in at about 50 tons with fuel included. The stage had a burn time of 470 seconds from takeoff. They had used 4 one-chamber RD-O120 engines. The stage was 59 meters (193.5 ft) tall and 7.75 meters (24.4 ft) wide. The center used liquid hydrogen as fuel instead of the kerosene used in the boosters.

The core stage had 7,848.124 kN of thrust in a vacuum.

The vehicle's control system development was led by NPO "Electropribor" in Khartron.

== Launch history ==
=== First launch (Energia–Polyus) ===
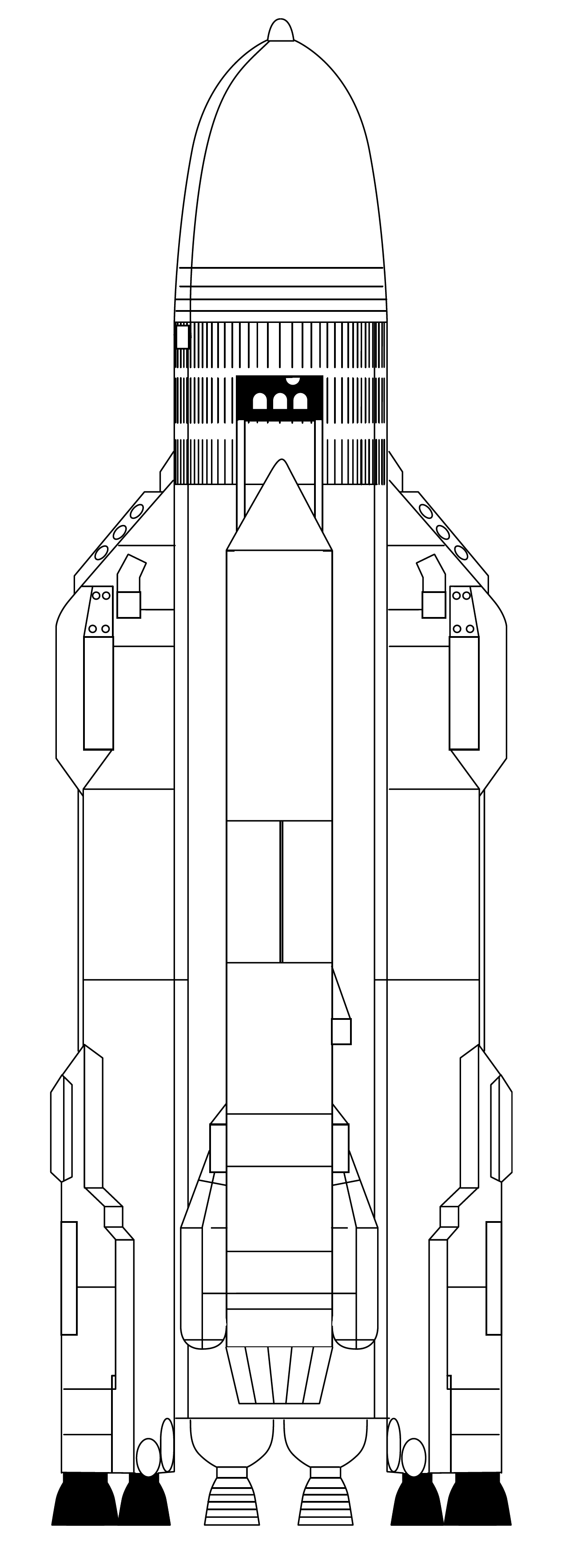
Polyus satellite on Energia launch vehicle

The Energia was first test-launched on 15 May 1987, with the Polyus spacecraft as the payload. An FGB ("functional cargo block") engine section originally built as a cancelled Mir module was incorporated into the upper stage used to insert the payload into orbit, similarly to Buran and the US Space Shuttle performing the final orbital insertion. The intended orbit had 280 km (170 mi) altitude and 64.6° inclination.

The Soviets had originally announced that the launch was a successful sub-orbital test of the new Energia booster with a dummy payload, but sometime later it was revealed that in fact the flight had been intended to bring Polyus into orbit. The two stages of the Energia launcher functioned as designed, but due to a software error in its attitude control system, Polyus's orbital insertion motor failed to inject the payload into orbit. Instead, Polyus reentered the atmosphere over the Pacific Ocean.

=== Second launch (Energia–Buran) ===
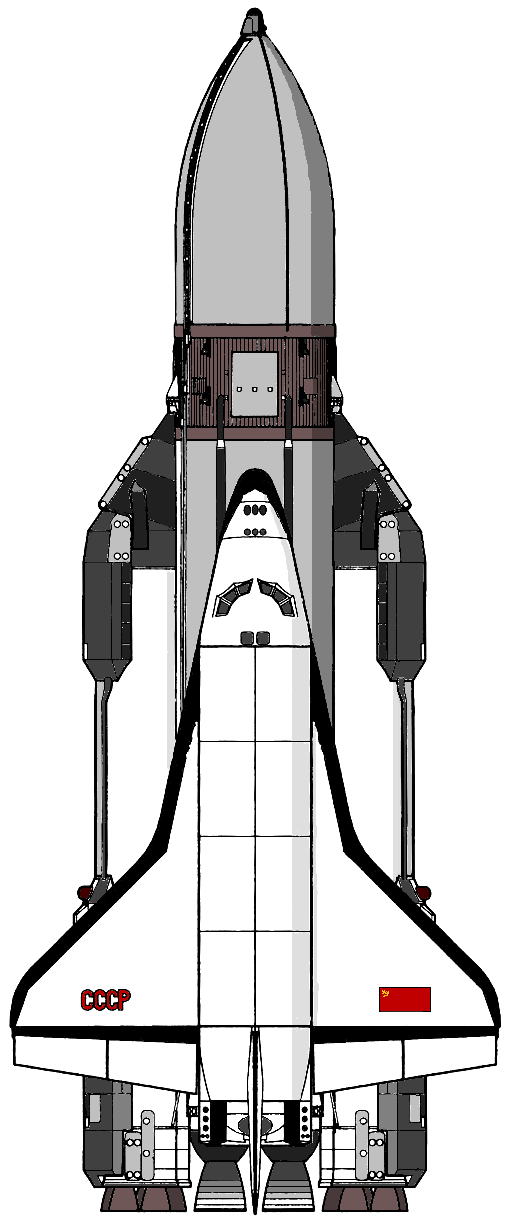
Buran shuttle on Energia launch vehicle

The second flight, and the first one where the payload successfully reached orbit, lifted off on 15 November 1988. This mission launched the uncrewed Buran orbiter. At apogee, Buran made a 66.7 m/s burn to reach a final orbit of 251 km × 263 km.

Energia Flights
Flight number (COSPAR ID)	Date (UTC)	Launch site	Serial no.	Payload	Orbit at payload separation	Remarks
1	15 May 1987; 17:30:00	Baikonur Cosmodrome Site 250	6SL	Polyus	−15 × 155 km × 64.61°	Spacecraft software error led to orbit insertion burn performed in incorrect attitude and payload re-entered atmosphere without entering orbit.
2 (1988-100A)	15 November 1988; 03:00:01	Baikonur Cosmodrome Site 110/37	1L	Buran	−11.2 × 154.2 km × 51.64° After burn: 251 x 263 km	First and only flight of Buran. The spacecraft orbited the Earth twice before de-orbiting and landed at Baikonur at 06:24 UTC.

== Discontinuation and potential revival ==
Production of Energia rockets ceased with the end of the Buran shuttle project in the late 1980s, and more certainly, with the fall of the Soviet Union in 1991. Since that time, there have been persistent rumors of the renewal of production, but given the political realities, that is highly unlikely.

After the conclusion of the program, a number or Energia core stages and boosters were kept in storage in the Rocket Assembly and Fueling Facility (MIK 112) at the Baikonur Cosmodrome. On May 12, 2002, the roof of the structure collapsed, destroying the only space-flown Buran orbiter, the Energia test article it was mated to, and all remaining Energia core stages.

While the Energia is no longer in production, the Zenit boosters were in use until 2017. The strap-on liquid-fuel boosters, which burned kerosene and liquid oxygen, were the basis of the Zenit rocket which used the same engines. The engine is the four combustion chamber RD-170. Its derivative, the RD-171, was used on the Zenit rocket. A half-sized derivative of the engine, the two-chamber RD-180, powered the American Lockheed Martin Atlas III vehicle, and still powers the Atlas V rocket, while the single-chamber derivative, the RD-191, has been used to launch the Korean Naro-1 (as a reduced-thrust variant named the RD-151) and the Russian Angara rocket. The RD-181, based on the RD-191, was used on the Antares 200 series rocket.

In August 2016, Roscosmos announced conceptual plans to develop a super heavy-lift launch vehicle from existing Energia components (particularly the RD-171 engine for side boosters) instead of pushing the less-powerful Angara A5V project. This would allow Russia to launch missions towards establishing a permanent Moon base with simpler logistics, launching just one or two 80–160-ton super-heavy rockets instead of four 40-ton Angara A5Vs implying quick-sequence launches and multiple in-orbit rendezvous. Tests of RD-171MV engine, an updated version of the engine used in Energia, were completed in September 2021 and may potentially be used in the successor Soyuz-5 rocket.

== Proposed variants ==
Three major design variants were conceptualized after the original configuration, each with vastly different payloads.

=== Energia-M ===
The Energia-M was an early-1990s design configuration and the smallest of the three. The number of boosters was reduced from four to two, the core stage was shortened and fitted with just one RD-0120 engine. It was designed to replace the Proton rocket, but lost a 1993 competition to the Angara rocket.

A non-functional prototype ("structural test vehicle") of the Energia M still exists in the Dynamic Test Stand facility at Baikonur Cosmodrome.

=== Energia-2 (GK-175) ===
Energia-2 was an evolution of the Energia studied in the 1980s. Unlike the Energia-Buran system, which was planned to be partially reusable (like the U.S. Space Shuttle), the GK-175 concept was to have allowed the recovery and reuse of all elements of the vehicle, similarly to the original, fully reusable Orbiter/Booster concept of the U.S. Shuttle. The Energia-2 core as proposed would be capable of re-entering and gliding to a landing.

=== Vulkan ===
The final never-built design concept was also the largest. With eight Block A boosters and an Energia-M core as the upper stage, the Vulkan (which shared the name with another Soviet heavy lift rocket that was cancelled years earlier) configuration was initially projected to launch up to 200 metric tonnes into 200 km orbit with inclination 50.7°.

The development of the Vulkan and the refurbishment of Universal Test Stand and Launch Pad at site 250 for its launches was in progress between 1990–1993 and abandoned soon after due to a lack of funds and the collapse of the Soviet Union.

== Comparison with the Space Shuttle ==
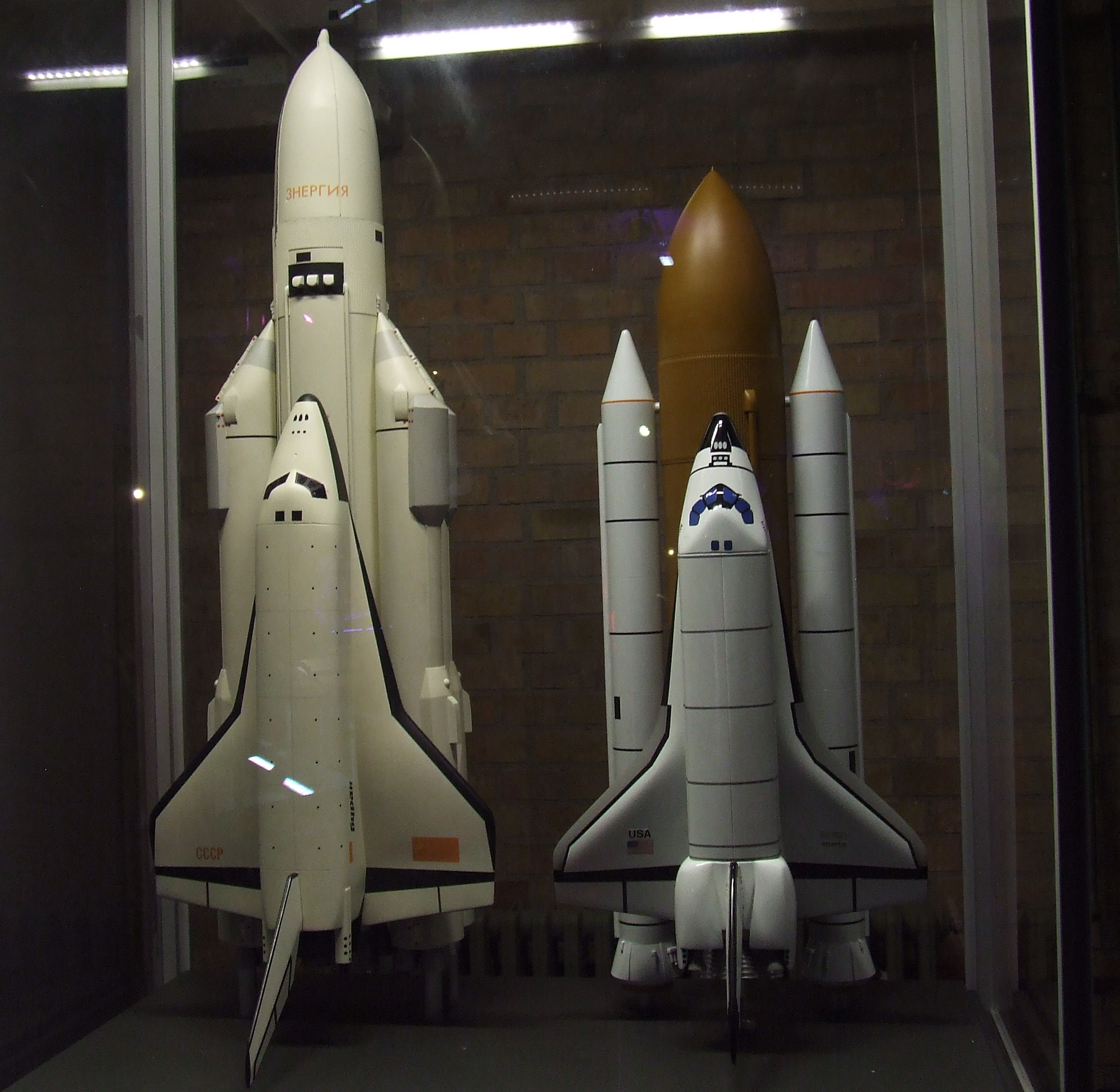
Model of Energia-Buran (left) and Space Shuttle (right) in Hungary

The Energia rocket was created as a response to the Americans building the Space Shuttle and was heavily based on the already designed Space Shuttle. While the Shuttle was made as a cheaper alternative for spaceflight, the Soviet government was paranoid about its possible use as a military weapon and responded by designing and building Energia-Buran.

The Space Shuttle could only bring a maximum 30 tonnes to LEO, but the Energia could bring a maximum 100 tonnes to LEO. This makes the Space Shuttle a heavy-lift launch vehicle and the Energia a super-heavy lift launch vehicle.

The Space Shuttle program lasted 30 years, operating from 1981 to 2011. The Energia program began in 1976 and after its only two launches officially ended in 1993.

== See also ==
- Comparison of orbital launchers families
- Comparison of orbital launch systems
