= N1 (rocket) =

Soviet super heavy-lift launch vehicle (1965–1972)

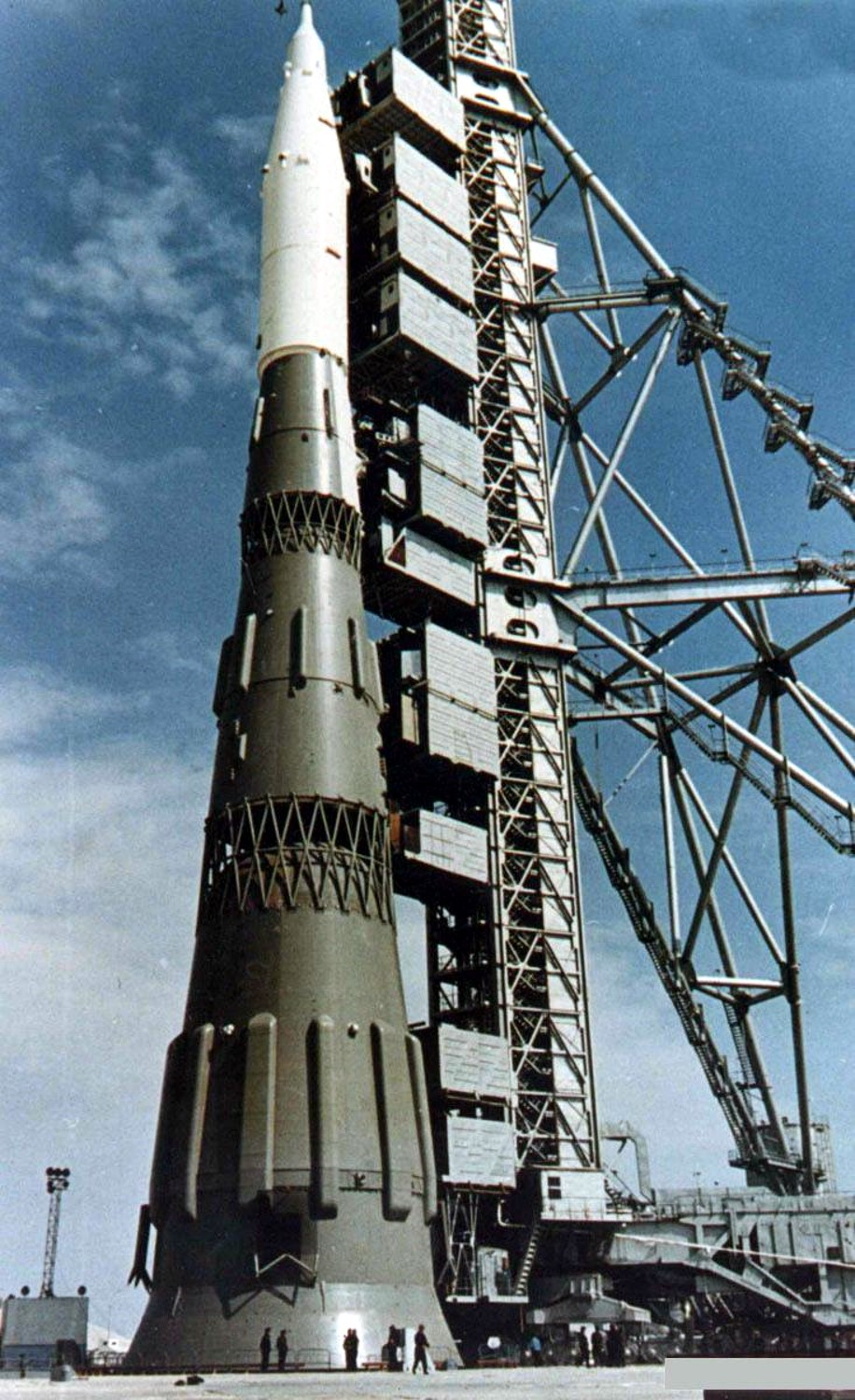
- Mockup at the Baikonur Cosmodrome in late 1967
- Function: Super heavy-lift launch vehicle for crewed lunar mission
- Manufacturer: OKB-1
- Country of origin: USSR
- Cost per launch: US$604 million in 1985 dollars ($1.81 billion in 2025)

Size
- Height: 105.3 m (345 ft)
- Diameter: 17 m (56 ft)
- Mass: 2,750,000 kg (6,060,000 lb)
- Stages: 5

Capacity

Payload to LEO
- Mass: 95,000 kg (209,000 lb)

Payload to TLI
- Mass: cca 33,000 kg (73,000 lb) (Note: Calculated as sum of the Block D, LK lander and LOK spacecraft)

Associated rockets
- Comparable: Saturn V

Launch history
- Status: Cancelled during development
- Launch sites: Baikonur, Site 110
- Total launches: 4
- Success(es): 0
- Failure: 4
- First flight: 21 February 1969
- Last flight: 23 November 1972

First stage – Block A
- Diameter: 17 m (56 ft)
- Powered by: 30 × NK-15
- Maximum thrust: SL: 45,780 kN (10,290,000 lb_{f}); vac: 46,320 kN (10,410,000 lb_{f})
- Specific impulse: SL: 297 s (2.91 km/s); vac: 318 s (3.12 km/s)
- Burn time: 125 seconds
- Propellant: LOX / RG-1

Second stage – Block B
- Powered by: 8 × NK-15V
- Maximum thrust: 14,064 kN (3,162,000 lb_{f})
- Specific impulse: 325 s (3.19 km/s)
- Burn time: 120 seconds
- Propellant: LOX / RG-1

Third stage – Block V
- Powered by: 4 × NK-19
- Maximum thrust: 1,800 kN (400,000 lb_{f})
- Specific impulse: 346 s (3.39 km/s)
- Burn time: 370 seconds
- Propellant: LOX / RG-1

Fourth stage – Block G
- Powered by: 1 × NK-21
- Maximum thrust: 329 kN (74,000 lb_{f})
- Specific impulse: 346 s (3.39 km/s)
- Burn time: 443 seconds
- Propellant: LOX / RG-1

Fifth stage – Block D (Note: The "fifth stage" similar to the Service propulsion system on the Apollo Command and Service Module, but treated as a part of the launch vehicle)
- Powered by: 1 × RD-58
- Maximum thrust: 83.36 kN (18,740 lb_{f})
- Specific impulse: 349 s (3.42 km/s)
- Burn time: 600 seconds
- Propellant: LOX / RG-1

The N1 (from Ракета-носитель Raketa-nositel', "Carrier Rocket"; Cyrillic: Н1, GRAU index: 11A52, Sheldon: G-1-e, DoD: SL-15) was a super heavy-lift launch vehicle of the Soviet space program intended for crewed travel to the Moon and beyond. All four launch attempts between 1969 and 1972 failed. Studied and designed by OKB-1 since 1959, it was the counterpart to the US Saturn V.

A five-stage kerolox-fuelled rocket, its Block A was the most powerful rocket stage flown for over 50 years, at 45 meganewtons of thrust, until the SpaceX Super Heavy. Block A's large cluster of thirty NK-15 engines, prone to individual failures, was managed by KORD, an analog computer which shut down engines opposite the failure, to maintain attitude control. Block B and V used eight and four hot staged engines respectively, planned to bring the rocket to low Earth orbit. Dangers of the complex engine cluster and fuel feeder systems were not discovered earlier as static fires were not conducted on the Block A. Its second test flight resulted in one of the largest conventional explosions ever, that disabled its Site 110 launch pad at Baikonur Cosmodrome for 18 months.

The N1-L3 aimed to compete with the US Apollo program for a crewed Moon landing, using a similar lunar orbit rendezvous method. The rocket had three stages, carrying the L3 lunar payload into low Earth orbit with two cosmonauts. The L3 contained the Block G trans-lunar injection stage; Block D for mid-course corrections, lunar orbit insertion, and initial surface descent; single-pilot LK lander; and two-pilot Soyuz 7K-LOK orbital spacecraft for return to Earth.

The N1 started development in October 1965, almost four years after the Saturn V. The project was derailed by the death of its chief designer Sergei Korolev in 1966; the program was suspended in 1974 and canceled in 1976. The TMK project of crewed Mars and Venus flybys also relied on the N1. OKB-1 later developed Energia, the only Soviet super-heavy lift rocket to reach orbit, flying in 1987 and 1988. Details of the Soviet crewed lunar programs were kept secret until the USSR was nearing collapse in 1989. From 2013, the NK-33 engines, built for the N1F improvement cancelled in 1974, were adapted to the smaller US Orbital Sciences Antares 100 rockets and Russian Soyuz 2.1v rockets.

== History ==
In 1967 the United States and the Soviet Union were in a race to be first to land a human on the Moon. The N1/L3 program received formal approval in 1964, which required development of the N1 launch vehicle, comparable in size to the American Saturn V.

On 25 November 1967, less than three weeks after the first Saturn V flight during the Apollo 4 mission, the Soviets rolled out an N1 mock-up to the newly constructed launch pad 110R at the Baikonur Cosmodrome in Soviet Kazakhstan. This Facilities Systems Logistic Test and Training Vehicle, designated 1M1, was designed to give engineers valuable experience in the rollout, launch pad integration, and rollback activities, similar to the Saturn V Facilities Integration Vehicle SA-500F testing at the Kennedy Space Center in Florida in mid-1966. While the crawler transported the Saturn V to the pad vertically, the N1 made the trip horizontally and was then raised to the vertical position at the pad, using a purpose built Transporter Erector (TE) named Grasshopper. Using TEs was standard practice in the Soviet space program. On December 11, after completion of various tests, the N1 mockup was lowered and rolled back to the assembly building. The 1M1 was used repeatedly in the following years for additional launchpad integration tests.

Although this test was carried out in secret, a US reconnaissance satellite photographed the N1 on the pad shortly before its rollback to the assembly building. NASA Administrator James Webb had access to this and other similar intelligence that showed that the Russians were seriously planning crewed lunar missions. That knowledge influenced several key US decisions in the coming months. The satellite imagery appeared to show the USSR was close to a flight test of the N1, but did not reveal that this particular rocket was just a mockup and that the USSR was many months behind the US in the race to land a human on the Moon (however, the CIA the NRO, and President Lyndon B. Johnson did know that the rocket was a mock-up per the daily presidential briefing of 27 December 1967). The Soviets were hopeful that they could carry out a test flight of the N1 in the first half of 1968, but for a variety of technical reasons the attempt did not occur for more than a year.

=== Early Soviet lunar concepts ===
Static 3D model of the rocket

In May 1961, the US announced the goal of landing a man on the Moon by 1970. During the same month, the report On Reconsideration of the Plans for Space Vehicles in the Direction of Defense Purposes set the first test launch of the N1 rocket for 1965. In June, Korolev was given a small amount of funding to start N1 development between 1961 and 1963. At the same time, Korolev proposed a lunar flyby mission using the new Soyuz spacecraft using an Earth orbit rendezvous profile, called the A-B-V. Several Soyuz rocket launches would be used to build up a complete Moon mission package, including one for the Soyuz spacecraft, another for the orbital tug, and one for an orbital tanker. This approach, driven by the limited capacity of the Soyuz rocket, meant that a rapid launch rate would be required to assemble the complex before any of the components ran out of consumables on-orbit.

A lunar surface lander concept was to use three N1 rockets: the first would launch the lander, lunar braking stage, and translunar insertion stage into orbit (referred to as the 19K). The two remaining launches would deliver large fuel tankers, known as 21Ks, to refuel the 19K. A final and fourth launch, of a Soyuz rocket, would launch a Soyuz spacecraft to dock with the 19K, which would boost to the Moon for a lunar landing and return. This architecture was not implemented, and instead Korolev proposed that the N1 be enlarged to allow a single-launch lunar mission.

In November–December 1961, Korolev and others tried to further argue that a super heavy lift rocket could deliver ultra heavy nuclear weapons, such as the just tested Tsar Bomba, or many warheads (up to 17) as further justification for the N1 design. Korolev was not inclined to use the rocket for military uses, but wanted to fulfill his space ambitions and saw military support as vital. The military response was lukewarm – they thought the N1 had little military usefulness and was worried it would divert funds away from pure military programs. Korolev's correspondence with military leaders continued until February 1962 with little progress.

Meanwhile, Chelomey's OKB-52 proposed an alternate mission with much lower risk. Instead of a crewed landing, Chelomei proposed a series of circumlunar missions to beat the US to the vicinity of the Moon. He also proposed a new booster for the mission, clustering four of his existing UR-200s (known as the SS-10 in the west) to produce a single larger booster, the UR-500. These plans were dropped when Glushko offered Chelomei the RD-270, which allowed the construction of the UR-500 in a much simpler "monoblock" design. He also proposed adapting an existing spacecraft design for the circumlunar mission, the single-cosmonaut LK-1. Chelomei felt that improvements in early UR-500/LK-1 missions would allow the spacecraft to be adapted for two cosmonauts.

The Strategic Missile Forces of the Soviet military were reluctant to support a politically motivated project with little military utility, but both Korolev and Chelomei pushed for a lunar mission. Between 1961 and 1964, Chelomei's less aggressive proposal was accepted, and development of his UR-500 and the LK-1 were given a relatively high priority.

=== Lunar N1 development starts ===
Valentin Glushko, who then held a near-monopoly on rocket engine design in the Soviet Union, proposed the RD-270 engine using unsymmetrical dimethylhydrazine (UDMH) and nitrogen tetroxide (N_{2}O_{4}) propellants to power the newly enlarged N1 design. These hypergolic propellants ignite on contact, reducing the complexity of the engine, and were widely used in Glushko's existing engines on various ICBMs. The full flow staged combustion cycle RD-270 was in testing before program cancellation, achieving a higher specific impulse than the gas-generator cycle Rocketdyne F-1 despite the use of UDMH/N_{2}O_{4} propellants with lower potential impulse. The F-1 engine was five years into its development at the time and still experiencing combustion stability problems. Rocketdyne eventually solved the F-1 instability problems by adding copper dividers as baffles, but the RD-270 still had unsolved instability problems when the N1 program was cancelled in 1974, long after the F-1 problems were solved.

Glushko pointed out that the US Titan II GLV had successfully flown crew with similar hypergolic propellants. Korolev felt that the toxic nature of the fuels and their exhaust presented a safety risk for crewed space flight, and that Kerosene/LOX was a better solution. The disagreement between Korolev and Glushko over the question of fuels ultimately became a major issue that hampered progress.

Personal issues between the two played a role, with Korolev holding Glushko responsible for his incarceration at the Kolyma Gulag in the 1930s and Glushko considering Korolev to be cavalier and autocratic towards things outside his competence. The difference of opinions led to a falling out between Korolev and Glushko. In 1962, a committee was appointed to resolve the dispute and agreed with Korolev. Glushko refused outright to work on LOX/kerosene engines, and with Korolev in general. Korolev eventually gave up and decided to enlist the help of Nikolai Kuznetsov, the OKB-276 jet engine designer, while Glushko teamed up with other rocket designers to build the very successful Proton, Zenit, and later Energia rockets.

Kuznetsov, who had limited experience in rocket design, responded with the NK-15, a fairly small engine that would be delivered in several versions tuned to different altitudes. To achieve the required amount of thrust, it was proposed that 24 NK-15s would be used in a clustered ring configuration. The ring of 24 engines would be separated from the oxidizer tank by an air gap, suspended via struts similar to those on the hot staging rings, with airflow supplied via the gaps in the struts. The air would be mixed with the exhaust in order to provide some degree of thrust augmentation, as well as engine cooling. Later, a ring of 6 inner engines were added, along with the thrust augmentation was dropped. The arrangement of 30 rocket engine nozzles on the N1's first stage could have been an attempt at creating a crude version of a toroidal aerospike engine system; more conventional aerospike engines were also studied.

=== N1-L3 lunar complex ===
N-1/L3 lunar mission profile

Korolev proposed a larger N1 combined with the new L3 lunar package based on the Soyuz 7K-L3. The L3 combined rocket stages, the modified Soyuz, and the new LK lunar lander were to be launched by a single N1 to conduct a lunar landing. Chelomei responded with a clustered UR-500-derived vehicle, topped with the LK-1 spacecraft already under development, and a lander developed by his design bureau. Korolev's proposal was selected as the winner in August 1964, but Chelomei was told to continue with his circumlunar UR-500/LK-1 work.

When Khrushchev was overthrown later in 1964, infighting between the two teams started anew. In October 1965, the Soviet government ordered a compromise; the circumlunar mission would be launched on Chelomei's UR-500 using Korolev's Soyuz spacecraft Soyuz 7K-L1, aka Zond (literally "probe"), aiming for a launch in 1967, the 50th anniversary of the Bolshevik Revolution. Korolev, meanwhile, would continue with his original N1-L3 proposal. Korolev had clearly won the argument, but work on the LK-1 continued anyway, as well as the Zond.

Korolev lobbied in 1964 for a crewed circumlunar mission, which was at first rejected, but was passed with the 3 August 1964 Central Committee resolution titled "On work involving the study of the Moon and outer space", with the objective of landing a cosmonaut on the Moon in 1967 or '68.

In January 1966, Korolev died due to complications of surgery to remove intestinal polyps that also discovered a large tumor. His work on N1-L3 was taken over by his deputy, Vasily Mishin, who did not have Korolev's political astuteness or influence, and was reputed to be a heavy drinker. After a few years of setbacks and four failed launches, in May 1974 Mishin was fired and replaced by Glushko, who immediately ordered the cancellation of the N1 programme and the crewed lunar mission in general, despite Mishin's assertion that the rocket will be fully operational in under two years.

=== N1 vehicle serial numbers ===
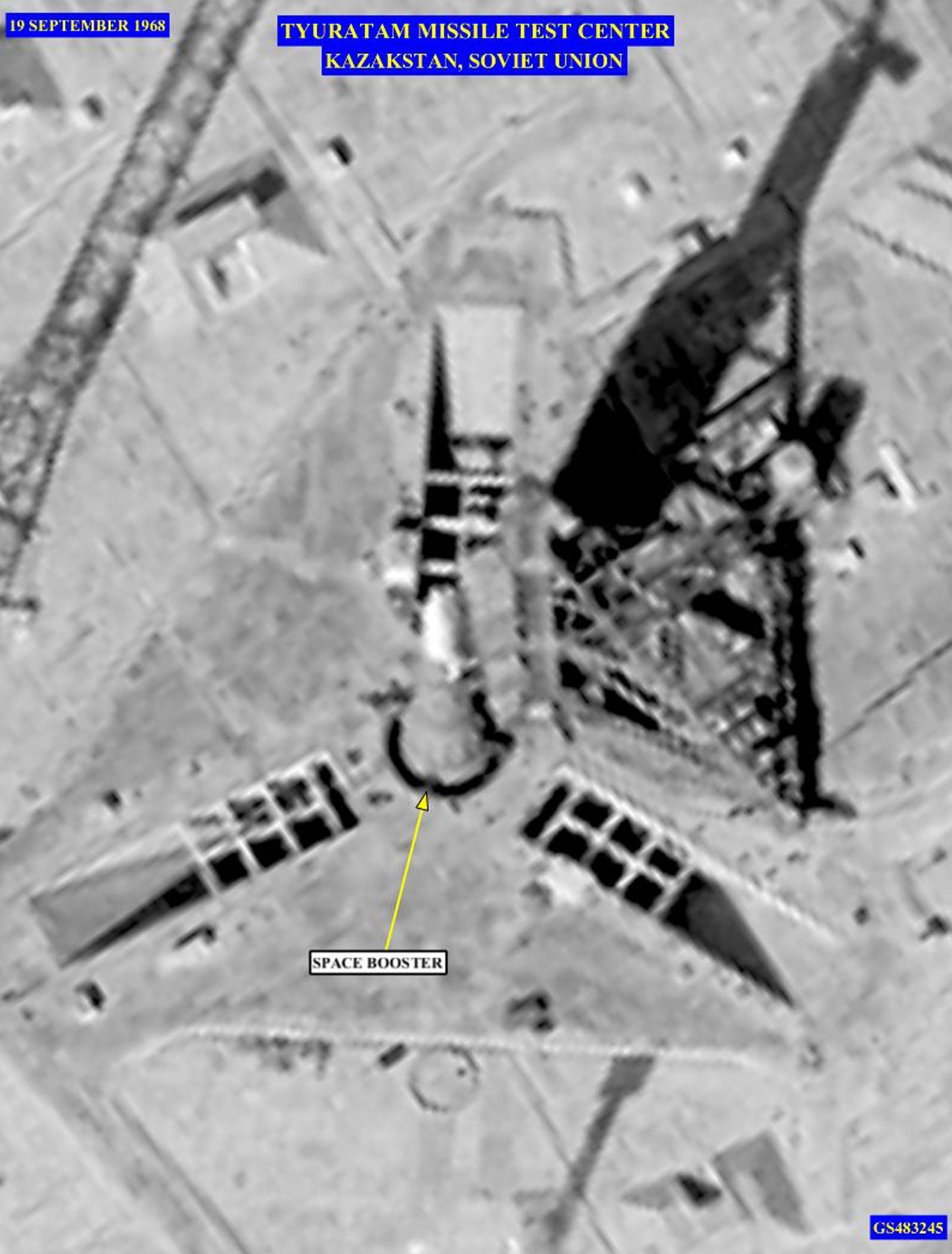
N1 imaged by US KH-8 Gambit reconnaissance satellite, 19 September 1968

- N1 1L – Full scale dynamic test model, each stage was individually dynamically tested; the full N1 stack was only tested at 1/4 scale.
- N1 2L (1M1) – Facilities Systems Logistic Test and Training Vehicle (FSLT & TV); Blocks A and B painted gray, Block V half gray/half white and L3 white.
- N1 3L – First launch, engine fire, exploded at 12 km. Blocks A and B painted gray, Block V half gray/half white and L3 white.
- N1 4L – Block A LOX tank developed cracks; never launched, parts from Block A used for other launchers; rest of airframe structure scrapped.
- N1 5L – Second launch, partially painted gray; first night launch, launch failure demolished pad 110 East. Blocks A and B painted white with 1/4 gray, Block V and L3 white.
- N1 6L – Third launch, flown from the second pad 110 West, deficient roll control, destroyed after 51s. Blocks A and B painted white with 1/3 gray, Block V and L3 white.
- N1 7L – Fourth launch, engine cutoff at 40 kilometres (22 nmi) caused propellant line hammering, rupturing the fuel system. All white.
- N1 8L and 9L – Flight ready N1Fs with improved NK-33 engines in Block A, scrapped when the program was canceled.
- N1 10L – Uncompleted, scrapped along with 8L and 9L.

=== N1F ===
Mishin continued with the N1F project after the cancellation of plans for a crewed Moon landing in the hope that the booster would be used to build the Zvezda moonbase. The program was terminated in 1974 when Mishin was replaced by Glushko. Two N1Fs were being readied for launch at the time, but these plans were canceled.

The two flight-ready N1Fs were scrapped and their remains could still be found around Baikonur years later used as shelters and storage sheds. The boosters were deliberately broken up in an effort to cover up the USSR's failed Moon attempts, which was publicly stated to be a paper project in order to fool the US into thinking there was a race going on. This cover story lasted until glasnost, when the remaining hardware was seen publicly on display.

=== Aftermath and engines ===
The program was followed by the "Vulkan" concept for a huge launch vehicle using Syntin/LOX propellants, later replaced by LH2/LOX on the 2nd and 3rd stages. "Vulkan" was superseded by the Energia/Buran program in 1976.

About 150 of the upgraded engines for the N1F escaped destruction. Although the rocket as a whole was unreliable, the NK-33 and NK-43 engines are rugged and reliable when used as a standalone unit. In the mid-1990s, Russia sold 36 engines for $1.1 million each and a license for the production of new engines to the US company Aerojet General.

The US company Kistler Aerospace worked on incorporating these engines into a new rocket design with the intention of offering commercial launch services, but the company eventually went into bankruptcy before seeing a single launch. Aerojet also modified the NK-33 to incorporate thrust vector control capability for Orbital Science's Antares launch vehicle. Antares used two of these modified AJ-26 engines for first stage propulsion. The first four launches of the Antares were successful, but on the fifth launch the rocket exploded shortly after launch. Preliminary failure analysis by Orbital pointed to a possible turbopump failure in one NK-33/AJ-26. Given Aerojet's previous problems with the NK-33/AJ-26 engine during the modification and test program (two engine failures in static test firings, one of which caused major damage to the test stand) and the later in-flight failure, Orbital decided that the NK-33/AJ-26 was not reliable enough for future use.

In Russia, N1 engines were not used again until 2004, when the remaining 70 or so engines were incorporated into a new rocket design, the Soyuz 3. As of 2005, the project was frozen due to the lack of funding. Instead, the NK-33 was incorporated into the first stage of a light variant of the Soyuz rocket, which was first launched on 28 December 2013.

== Description ==
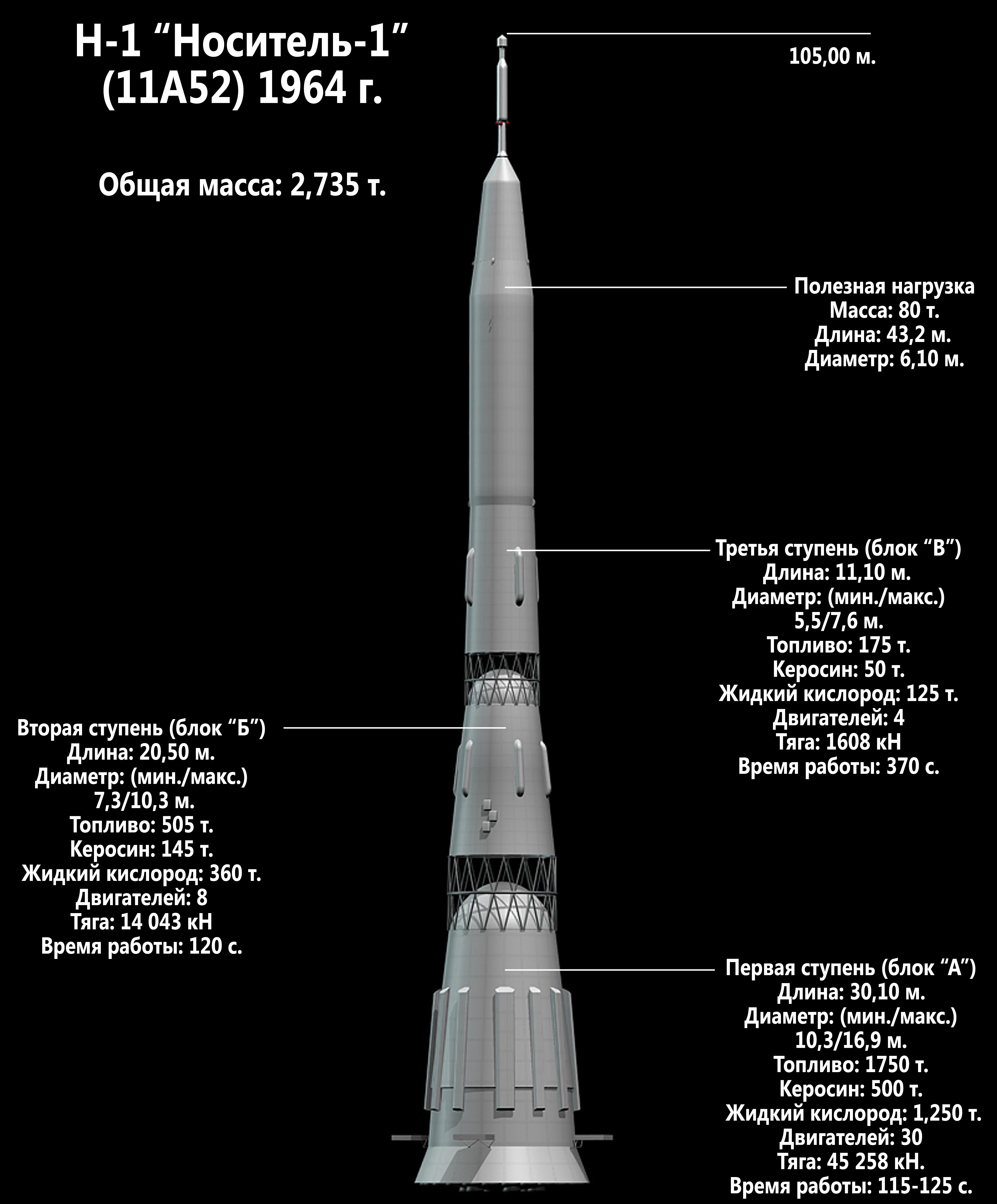
Scheme of the rocket stages (in Russian)

The N1 stood 105 meters (344 ft) tall with its L3 payload and 17 meters (55.7 ft) wide. The N1-L3 consisted of five stages in total: the first three (N1) for insertion into a low Earth parking orbit, and another two (L3) for trans-lunar injection and lunar orbit insertion. Fully loaded and fueled, the N1-L3 weighed 2,750 tonnes (6,060,000 lb). The lower three stages were shaped to produce a single frustum 17 meters (56 feet) wide at the base, while the L3 section was mostly cylindrical, carried inside a shroud an estimated 3.5 meters (11 feet) wide. The conical shaping of the lower stages was due to the arrangement of the tanks within, a smaller spherical kerosene tank on top of the larger liquid oxygen tank below.

During the N1's lifetime, a series of improved engines was introduced to replace those used in the original design. The resulting modified N1 was known as the N1F, but did not fly before the project's cancellation.

=== Block A first stage ===
The first stage, Block A, was powered by 30 NK-15 engines arranged in two rings, the main ring of 24 at the outer edge of the booster and the core propulsion system consisting of the inner 6 engines at about half diameter. The control system was primarily based on differential throttling of the engines of the outer ring for pitch and yaw. The core propulsion system was not used for control. The Block A also included four grid fins, which were later used on Soviet air-to-air missile designs. Block A had a planned burn time of 125 seconds. The stage alone had a dry mass of 180.8 tons.

In total, the Block A produced 45,400 kN (10,200,000 lbf) of thrust thus far exceeding the 33,700 kN (7,600,000 lbf) thrust of the Saturn V, and the record would stand for over half a century, until the SpaceX Super Heavy surpassed it in 2023.

==== Engine control system ====
The KORD (Russian acronym for Kontrol Raketnykh Dvigateley – literally "Control (of) Rocket Engines" – Контроль ракетных двигателей) was the system devised to supervise the large cluster of 30 engines in Block A (the first stage) and also shut down opposing engines that suffered failure, to maintain symmetrical thrust in the outer ring of 24 engines. The differential thrust method used by the N-1 to steer required precise throttle commands and resulted in more time spent in transients as the engines throttled up and down. The N-1 controlled the differential thrusting of the outer ring of 24 engines for pitch and yaw attitude control by throttling them appropriately and it also shut down malfunctioning engines situated opposite each other. This was to negate the pitch or yaw moment diametrically opposing engines in the outer ring would generate, thus maintaining symmetrical thrust. Block A could perform nominally with two pairs of opposing engines shut down (26/30 engines). Unfortunately the KORD system was unable to react to rapidly occurring processes such as the exploding turbo-pump during the second launch.

In addition to the KORD system that was improved for the fourth flight, a new computer system was developed for the fourth and last launch (Vehicle 7L). The S-530 was the first Soviet digital guidance and control system,. The S-530 supervised all control tasks in the launch vehicle and spacecraft, of which the N1 carried two, one located in the Block V third stage that controlled the engines for the first three stages. The second S-530 was located in the Soyuz LOK command module and provided control for the rest of the mission from TLI to lunar flyby and return to Earth.

In parallel, KORD was improved and according to Chertok it "has finally achieved a high degree of reliability" in anticipation of the fourth launch.

=== Block B second stage ===
The second stage, Block B, was powered by 8 NK-15V engines arranged in a single ring. The only major difference between the NK-15 and -15V was the engine bell and various tunings for air-start and high-altitude performance. The N1F Block B replaced the NK-15 engines with upgraded NK-43 engines. Block B had a planned burn time of 120 seconds. It had a dry mass of 52.2 tons.

Block B could withstand the shutdown of one pair of opposing engines (6/8 engines).

=== Block V third stage ===
The upper stage, Block V (В/V being the third letter in the Russian alphabet), mounted four smaller NK-21 engines in a square. The N1F Block V replaced the NK-21 engines with NK-31 engines. Block V had a planned burn time of 370 seconds. The stage had a dry mass of 13.7 tons.

Block V could function with one engine shut down and three functioning correctly.

=== Assembly, transport, erection ===
The N1 made the trip horizontally and was then raised to the vertical position at the pad, using a purpose built Transporter Erector (TE) named Grasshopper. Using TEs were standard practice in the Soviet space program. There was a service tower/gantry at the pad with umbilical connections for liquid fueling.

=== Development problems ===
The complex plumbing needed to feed fuel and oxidizer into the clustered arrangement of rocket engines was fragile and a major factor in 2 of the 4 launch failures. Unlike Kennedy Space Center Launch Complex 39, the N1's Baikonur Cosmodrome could not be reached by heavy barge. To allow transport by rail, all of the stages had to be shipped in pieces and assembled at the launch site. This led to difficulties in testing that contributed to the N1's lack of success.

The NK-15 engines had a number of valves that were activated by pyrotechnics rather than hydraulic or mechanical means, this being a weight-saving measure. Once shut, the valves could not be re-opened. This meant that the engines for Block A were only test-fired individually and the entire cluster of 30 engines was never static test fired as a unit. Sergei Khrushchev stated that only two out of every batch of six engines were tested, and not the units actually intended for use in the booster. As a result, the complex and destructive vibrational modes (which ripped apart propellant lines and turbines), as well as exhaust plume and fluid dynamic problems (causing vehicle roll, vacuum cavitation, and other problems), in Block A were not discovered and worked out before flight. Blocks B and V were static test fired as complete units.

While trying to find ways for more performance, research was conducted on the feasibility of using the first stage (Block A) as an aerospike. To achieve this, they would lower the initial 30 NK-15F engines to 24 engines around the rim, leaving the center free for air to be ducted in to form a passive aerospike of the entire first stage. The goal was to achieve better performance at sea level. Further concepts removed the NK-15Fs altogether and replace them with an annular combustion chamber. The concepts were discarded as the calculated performance gains didn't outweigh the additional mass and complexities of the different engines, plus the six centre engines that formed the core propulsion system were need to increase the N1 payload to LEO from 75 to 95 tonnes.

Because of its technical difficulties and lack of funding for a comprehensive test campaign, the N1 never completed a test flight. Twelve test flights were planned, with only four flown. All four uncrewed launches ended in failure before first-stage separation. The longest flight lasted 107 seconds, just before first-stage separation. Two test launches occurred in 1969, one in 1971, and the final one in 1972.

=== Comparison with Saturn V ===
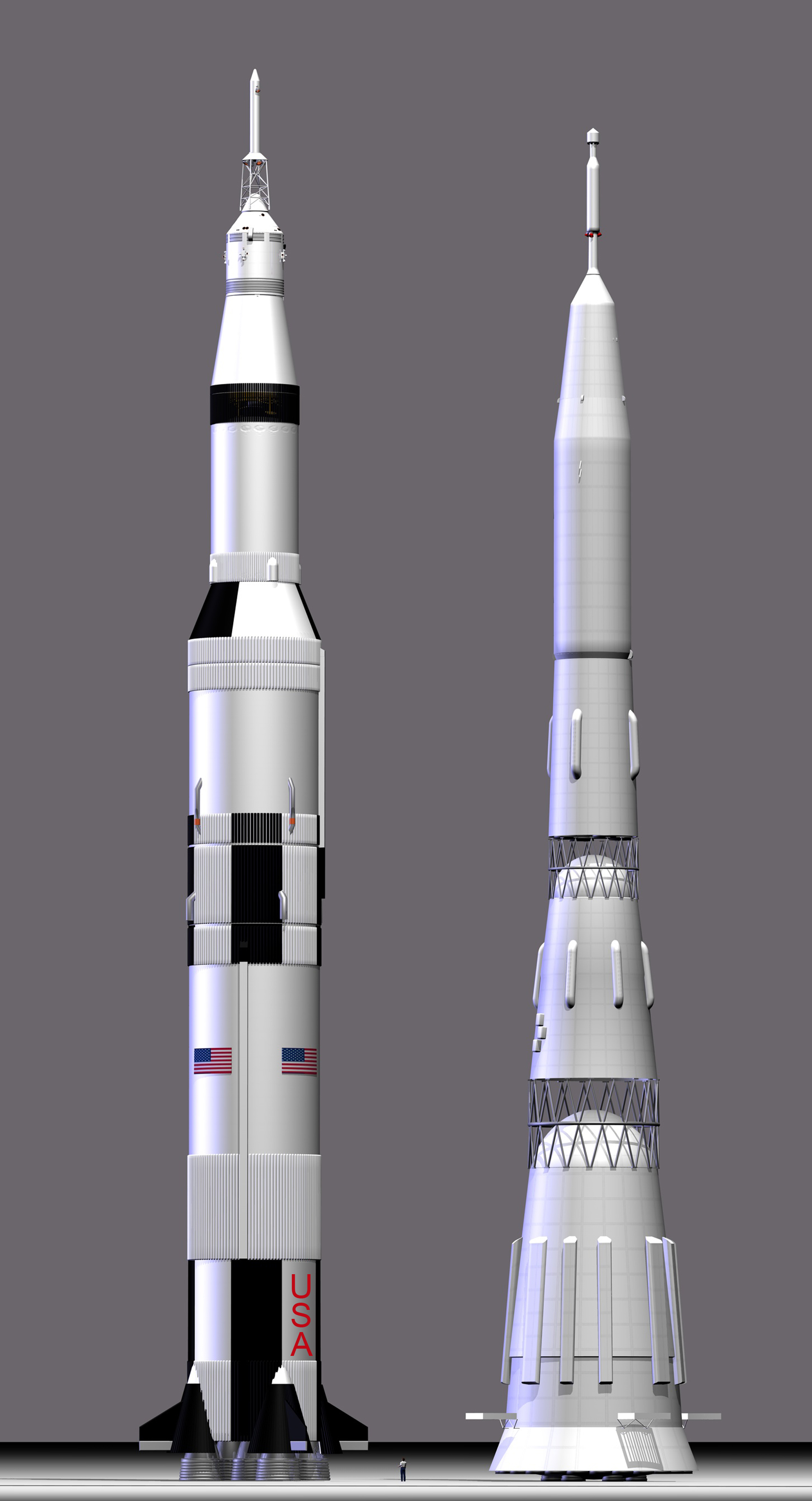
A comparison of the US Saturn V rocket (left) with the Soviet N1/L3. Note: human at bottom illustrates scale

At 105 meters (344 ft), the N1-L3 was slightly shorter than the American Apollo-Saturn V (111 meters, 363 ft). The N-1 had a smaller overall diameter but a greater maximum diameter (17 m/56 ft vs. 10 m/33 ft). The N1 produced more thrust in each of its first three stages than the corresponding stages of the Saturn V. The N1-L3 produced more total impulse in its first four stages than the Saturn V did in its three (see table below).

The N1 was intended to place the approximately 95 t (209,000 lb) L3 payload into low Earth orbit, with the fourth stage included in the L3 complex intended to place 23.5 t (52,000 lb) into trans-lunar orbit. In comparison, the Saturn V placed the roughly 45 t (100,000 lb) Apollo spacecraft plus about 74.4 t (164,100 lb) of fuel remaining in the S-IVB third stage for trans-lunar injection into a similar Earth parking orbit.

The N1 used kerosene-based rocket fuel in all three of its main stages, while the Saturn V used liquid hydrogen to fuel its second and third stages, which yielded an overall performance advantage due to the higher specific impulse. The N1 also wasted available propellant volume by using spherical propellant tanks under a roughly conical external skin, while the Saturn V used most of its available cylindrical skin volume to house capsule-shaped hydrogen and oxygen tanks, with common bulkheads between the tanks in the second and third stages.

The N1-L3 would have been able to convert only 9.3% of its three-stage total impulse into Earth orbit payload momentum (compared to 12.14% for the Saturn V), and only 3.1% of its four-stage total impulse into trans-lunar payload momentum, compared to 6.2% for the Saturn V.

At Max-Q, the S-IC of the Saturn V would shut down the center F-1 to reduce forces; on the N1, the center 6 NK-15s on the Block A would be shut down. A hard shutdown of these engines caused part of the failure of the 7L flight.

The assembly of the two rockets varied. While the Saturn V was assembled vertically and transported vertically on a crawler, the N1 was transported to the launch pad differently, being horizontally transported on a crawler and was then raised vertically at the pad itself for launch, using a Transporter Erector. Both of these methods were standard in the American space program and Soviet space program respectively.

The Saturn V also never lost a payload in two development and eleven operational launches, while four N1 development launch attempts all resulted in catastrophic failure, with two payload losses.

	Apollo-Saturn V	N1-L3
Diameter, maximum	10 m (33 ft)	17 m (56 ft)
Height w/ payload	111 m (363 ft)	105 m (344 ft)
Gross weight	2,938 t (6,478,000 lb)	2,750 t (6,060,000 lb)
First stage	S-IC	Block A
Thrust, SL	33,000 kN (7,500,000 lbf)	45,400 kN (10,200,000 lbf)
Burn time	168 seconds	125 seconds
Second stage	S-II	Block B
Thrust, vac	5,141 kN (1,155,800 lbf)	14,040 kN (3,160,000 lbf)
Burn time	384 seconds	120 seconds
Orbital insertion stage	S-IVB (burn 1)	Block V
Thrust, vac	901 kN (202,600 lbf)	1,610 kN (360,000 lbf)
Burn time	147 seconds	370 seconds
Total impulse (Note: Neglects first stage thrust increase with altitude)	7,711,000 kilonewton·seconds (1,733,600,000 pound·seconds)	7,956,000 kilonewton·seconds (1,789,000,000 pound·seconds)
Orbital payload	120,200 kg (264,900 lb) (Note: Includes mass of Earth departure fuel)	95,000 kg (209,000 lb)
Injection velocity	7,793 m/s (25,568 ft/s)	7,793 m/s (25,570 ft/s) (Note: Assumed identical to Saturn V value)
Payload momentum	936,300,000 kilogram·meters per second (210,500,000 slug·feet per second)	740,300,000 kilogram·meters per second (166,440,000 slug·feet per second)
Propulsive efficiency	12.14%	9.31%
Earth departure stage	S-IVB (burn 2)	Block G
Thrust, vac	895 kN (201,100 lbf)	446 kN (100,000 lbf)
Burn time	347 seconds	443 seconds
Total impulse	8,022,000 kilonewton·seconds (1,803,400,000 pound·seconds)	8,153,000 kilonewton·seconds (1,833,000,000 pound·seconds)
Translunar payload	45,690 kg (100,740 lb)	23,500 kg (51,800 lb)
Injection velocity	10,834 m/s (35,545 ft/s)	10,834 m/s (35,540 ft/s)
Payload momentum	495,000,000 kilogram·meters per second (111,290,000 slug·feet per second)	254,600,000 kilogram·meters per second (57,240,000 slug·feet per second)
Propulsive efficiency	6.17%	3.12%

== Launch history ==
Flight number	Date (UTC)	Launch site	Serial no.	Payload	Outcome	Remarks
1	21 February 1969; 09:18:07	Baikonur Site 110/38	3L	Zond L1S-1	Failure	KORD wrongly caused shut down all engines.
2	3 July 1969; 20:18:32	Baikonur Site 110/38	5L	Zond L1S-2	Failure	Multiple engines shut off after liftoff. Destroyed launch pad 110 East. One of the largest accidental artificial non-nuclear explosions in history.
3	26 June 1971; 23:15:08	Baikonur Site 110/37	6L	Soyuz 7K-L1E No.1	Failure	Extreme roll caused vehicle breakup.
4	23 November 1972; 06:11:55	Baikonur Site 110/37	7L	Soyuz 7K-LOK No.1	Failure	After planned center engines shut off, a shock wave cut fuel lines, causing a fire that caused KORD to shut down all engines.

=== First failure, serial 3L ===
February 21, 1969: serial number 3L – Zond L1S-1 (Soyuz 7K-L1S (Zond-M) modification of Soyuz 7K-L1 "Zond" spacecraft) for Moon flyby.

A few seconds into launch, a transient voltage caused the KORD to shut down Engine #12. After this happened, the KORD shut off Engine #24 to maintain symmetrical thrust. At T+6 seconds, pogo oscillation in the #2 engine tore several components off their mounts and started a propellant leak. At T+25 seconds, further vibrations ruptured a fuel line and caused RP-1 to spill into the aft section of the booster. When it came into contact with the leaking gas, a fire started. The fire then burned through wiring in the power supply, causing electrical arcing that was picked up by sensors and interpreted by the KORD as a pressurization problem in the turbopumps. The KORD responded by issuing a general command to shut down the entire first stage at T+68 seconds into launch. This signal was also transmitted up to the second and third stages, "locking" them and preventing a manual ground command from being sent to start their engines. Telemetry also showed that the power generators in the N-1 continued functioning until the impact with the ground at T+183 seconds.

Investigators discovered the remains of the rocket 52 kilometers (32 miles) from the launch pad. Vasily Mishin had initially blamed the generators for the failure, as he could not think of any other reason why all 30 engines would shut down at once, but this was quickly disproven by telemetry data and the recovery of the generators from the crash site. They had survived in good condition and were shipped back to the Istra plant, where they were refurbished and worked without any problems under bench testing. The investigative team did not speculate as to whether the burning first stage could have continued flying if the KORD system had not shut it down.

The KORD was found to have a number of serious design flaws and poorly programmed logic. One unforeseen flaw was that its operating frequency, 1000 Hz, happened to perfectly coincide with vibration generated by the propulsion system, and the shutdown of Engine #12 at liftoff was believed to have been caused by pyrotechnic devices opening a valve, which produced a high-frequency oscillation that went into adjacent wiring and was assumed by the KORD to be an overspeed condition in the engine's turbopump. The wiring in Engine #12 was believed to be particularly vulnerable to this effect due to its length; however, other engines had similar wiring and were unaffected. Also, the system's operating voltage increased to 25 V instead of the nominal 15 V. The control wiring was relocated and coated with asbestos for fireproofing and the operating frequency changed. The launch escape system was activated and did its job properly, saving the mockup spacecraft. All subsequent flights had freon fire extinguishers installed next to every engine. According to Sergei Afanasiev, the logic of the command to shut down the entire cluster of 30 engines in Block A was incorrect in that instance, as the subsequent investigation revealed.

=== Second failure, serial 5L ===
Serial number 5L – Zond L1S-2 for Moon orbit and flyby and intended photography of possible crewed landing sites.

The second N-1 vehicle was launched on 3 July 1969 and carried a modified L1 Zond spacecraft and live escape tower. Boris Chertok claimed that a mass model lunar module was also carried; however, most sources indicate that only the L1S-2 and boost stages were on board N-1 5L. Launch took place at 23:18 Moscow time from launch pad 110 East. The flight lasted only a few moments; as soon as it cleared the tower, there was a flash of light, and debris could be seen falling from the bottom of the first stage. All engines instantly shut down except engine #18. This caused the N-1 to lean over at a 45-degree angle and drop back onto the pad. The nearly 2300 tons of propellant on board triggered a massive blast and shock wave that shattered windows across the launch complex and sent debris flying as far as 10 kilometers (6 miles) from the center of the explosion. Launch crews were permitted outside half an hour after the accident and encountered droplets of unburnt fuel still raining down from the sky. The majority of the N-1's propellant load had not been consumed in the accident, and most of what had burned had been in the first stage of the rocket. However, the worst-case scenario, mixing of the fuel and LOX to form an explosive gel, had not occurred. The subsequent investigation revealed that up to 85% of the propellant on board the rocket had not detonated, reducing the force of the blast. The launch escape system had activated at the moment of engine shutdown (T+15 seconds) and pulled the L1S-2 capsule to safety 2.0 kilometers (1.2 miles) away. Impact with the pad occurred at T+23 seconds. Launch Complex 110 East was thoroughly leveled by the blast, with the concrete pad caved in and one of the lighting towers knocked over and twisted around itself. Despite the devastation, most of the telemetry tapes were found intact in the debris field and examined.

It was found that the LOX turbopump in the #8 engine had exploded just before liftoff. (The pump was recovered from the debris and found to have signs of fire and melting). The resultant shock wave severed surrounding propellant lines and started a fire from leaking fuel. The fire had damaged various components in the thrust section leading to the engines gradually being shut down between T+10 and T+12 seconds. The KORD had shut off engines #7, #19, #20, and #21 after detecting abnormal pressure and pump speeds. Telemetry did not provide any explanation as to what shut off the other engines. Engine #18, which had caused the booster to lean over 45 degrees, continued operating until impact, something engineers were never able to satisfactorily explain.

Why the #8 turbopump had exploded could not be determined exactly. Working theories were that either a piece of a pressure sensor had broken off and lodged in the pump, or that its impeller blades had rubbed against the metal casing, creating a friction spark that had ignited the LOX. The #8 engine had operated erratically prior to shutdown and a pressure sensor detected "incredible force" in the pump. Vasily Mishin believed that a pump rotor had disintegrated, but Kuznetsov argued that the NK-15 engines were entirely blameless and Mishin, who had defended the use of Kuznetsov's engines two years earlier, could not publicly come out and challenge him. Kuznetsov succeeded in getting the postflight investigative committee to rule the cause of the engine failure as "ingestion of foreign debris". After this flight, fuel filters were installed in later models. Vladimir Barmin, chief director of launch facilities at Baikonur, also argued that the KORD should be locked for the first 15–20 seconds of flight to prevent a shutdown command from being issued until the booster had cleared the pad area. The destroyed complex was photographed by American satellites, disclosing to the Western World that the Soviet Union had been constructing a Moon rocket. It took 18 months to rebuild the launch pad and delayed launches. The explosion had been visible that evening 35 kilometres (22 miles) away at Leninsk (See Tyuratam).

=== Third failure, serial 6L ===
June 26, 1971: serial number 6L – dummy Soyuz 7K-LOK (Soyuz 7K-L1E No.1) and dummy LK module-spacecraft

Soon after lift-off, due to unexpected eddies and counter-currents at the base of Block A (the first stage), the N-1 experienced an uncontrolled roll beyond the capability of the control system to compensate. The KORD computer sensed an abnormal situation and sent a shutdown command to the first stage, but as noted above, the guidance program had since been modified to prevent this from happening until 50 seconds into launch. The roll, which had initially been 6° per second, began rapidly accelerating. At T+39 seconds, the booster was rolling at nearly 40° per second, causing the inertial guidance system to go into gimbal lock and at T+48 seconds, the vehicle disintegrated from structural loads. The inter-stage truss between the second and third stages twisted apart and the latter separated from the stack and at T+50 seconds, the cutoff command to the first stage was unblocked and the engines immediately shut down. The upper stages impacted about 7 kilometers (4 miles) from the launch complex. Despite the engine shutoff, the first and second stages still had enough momentum to travel for some distance before falling to earth about 15 kilometers (9 miles) from the launch complex and blasting a 15-meter-deep (50-foot) crater in the steppe. This N1 had dummy upper stages without the rescue system.

The next, last vehicle would have a much more powerful stabilization system with dedicated engines (in the previous versions stabilization was done by directing exhaust from the main engines). The engine control system would also be reworked, increasing the number of sensors from 700 to 13,000.

=== Fourth failure, serial 7L ===
November 23, 1972: serial number 7L – regular Soyuz 7K-LOK (Soyuz 7K-LOK No.1) and dummy LK module-spacecraft for Moon flyby

The start and lift-off went well. At T+90 seconds, a programmed shutdown of the core propulsion system (the six center engines) was performed to reduce structural stress on the booster. Because of excessive dynamic loads caused by a hydraulic shock wave when the six engines were shut down, lines for feeding fuel and oxidizer to the core propulsion system burst and a fire started in the boat-tail of the booster; in addition, the #4 engine exploded. As expected, KORD shut down all engines, and according to Chertok KORD behaved as expected during the whole flight and during the failure. The first stage broke up starting at T+107 seconds and all telemetry data ceased at T+110 seconds. The launch escape system activated and pulled the Soyuz 7K-LOK to safety. The upper stages were ejected from the stack and crashed into the steppe. An investigation revealed that the abrupt shutdown of the engines led to fluctuations in the fluid columns of the feeder pipes, which ruptured and spilled fuel and oxidizer onto the shut down, but still hot, engines. A failure of the #4 engine turbopump was also suspected. It was believed that the launch could have been salvaged had ground controllers sent a manual command to jettison the first stage and begin second stage burn early as the stage failed only 15 seconds before it was due to separate at T+125 seconds and it had reached the nominal burn time of 110 seconds according to the cyclogram.

=== Canceled fifth launch ===
Vehicle serial number 8L was prepared for August 1974. It included a regular 7K-LOK Soyuz 7K-LOK and a regular LK module-spacecraft of the L3 lunar expedition complex. It was intended for a Moon flyby and uncrewed landing in preparation for a future crewed mission. As the N1-L3 program was canceled in May 1974, this launch never took place.

== Confusion on L3 designation ==
There is confusion among Russian online sources as to whether N1-L3 (Russian: Н1-Л3) or N1-LZ (Russian: Н1-ЛЗ) was intended, because of the similarity of the Cyrillic letter Ze for "Z" and the numeral "3". Sometimes both forms are used within the same Russian website (or even the same article). English sources refer only to N1-L3. The correct designation is L3, representing one of the five branches of Soviet lunar exploration. Stage 1 (Л1) was planned as a crewed circumlunar flight (partially realized in the Zond program); stage 2 (Л2) was an uncrewed lunar rover (realized in Lunokhod); stage 3 (Л3) was to have been a crewed lunar landing (using the LOK orbiter and LK lander); stage 4 (Л4) was conceptualized as a crewed spacecraft in lunar orbit; and stage 5 (Л5) was conceptualized as a heavy crewed lunar rover to support a crew of 3–5 people.

== See also ==
- Comparison of orbital launch systems
- Comparison of orbital launchers families
- Nova (NASA rocket)
- R-56 (rocket)
- Space Launch System (NASA SLS)
- SpaceX Starship
- Universal Rockets UR-700

== Bibliography ==
- "L3". Encyclopedia Astronautica. Archived from the original on 20 August 2016.
- Matthew Johnson (2014). N-1: For the Moon and Mars A Guide to the Soviet Superbooster. ARA Press; First edition. ISBN 9780989991407.
