= Baikonur Cosmodrome Site 110 =

Rocket launch site in Kazakhstan

Site 110
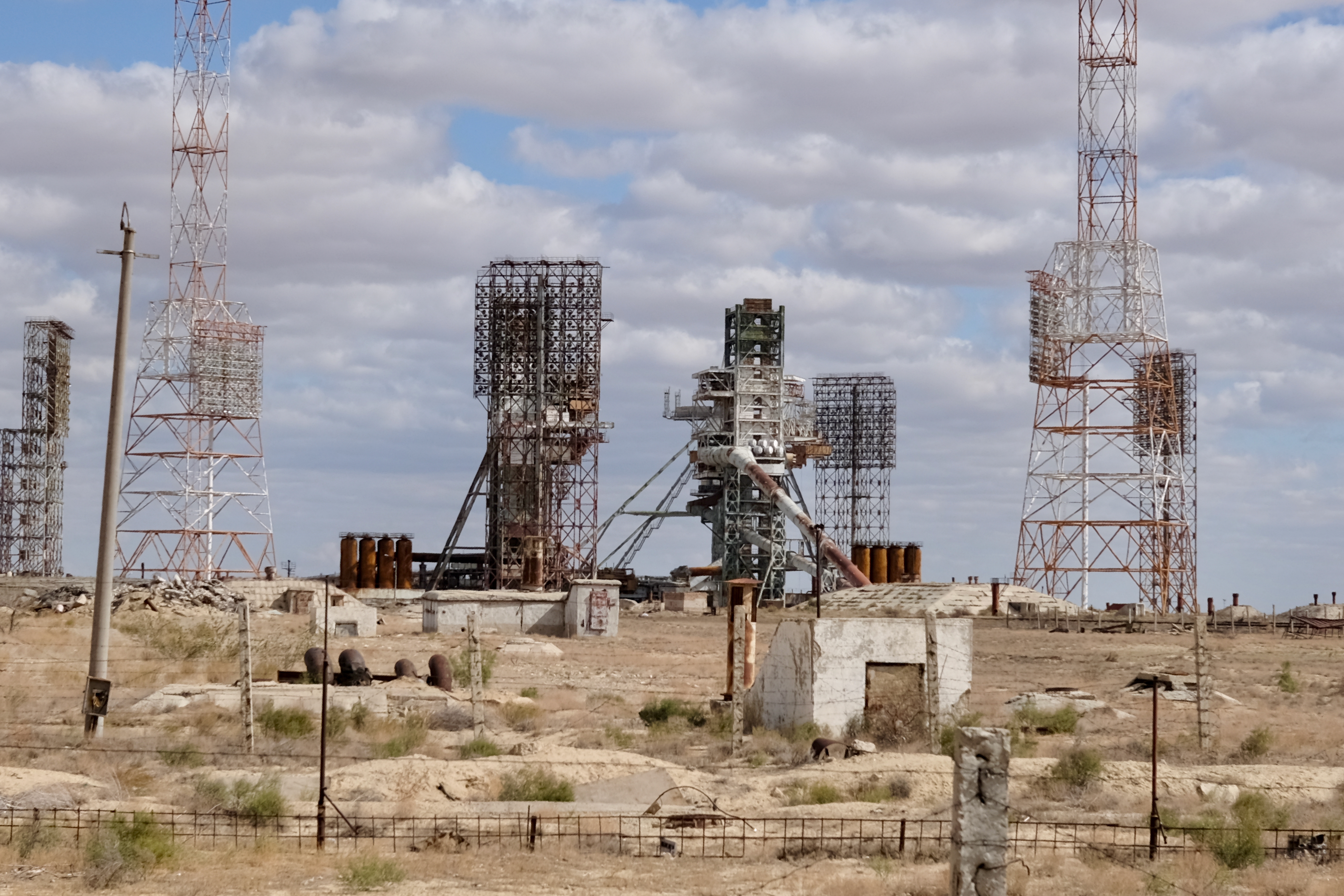
- Launch site: Baikonur Cosmodrome
- Location: 45.9647°N 63.3049°E
- Total launches: 5
- Launch pad: 2
Site 110/37 launch history
- Status: Inactive
- Launches: 3
- First launch: 26 June 1971
- Last launch: 15 November 1988
- Associated rockets: N1; Energia
Site 110/38 launch history
- Status: Inactive (destroyed)
- Launches: 2
- First launch: 21 February 1969
- Last launch: 3 July 1969
- Associated rockets: N1; Energia (unused)

Site 110 at the Baikonur Cosmodrome is a launch facility which was used by the N1 rocket during the late 1960s and early 1970s, and by the Energia rocket during the 1980s.

== Site ==
Site 110 consists of two launch pads: The right (or east) pad, called "110/38" or "110R", was completed first. It was followed by the left (or west) pad, called "110/37" or "110L". The complex was built in the 1960s as part of the Soviet crewed lunar programs, for use by the N1 rocket.

A total of five launches were made from the complex: Four N1 launches as well as one Energia launch, carrying the Buran spaceplane. Following the dissolution of the Soviet Union the Energia and Buran programmes were cancelled, and the complex was abandoned.

== Usage ==
=== N1 ===
Site 110 was intended as the launch site for crewed lunar landing missions using the Soyuz 7K-L3 spacecraft and the LK lander. The N1 made four flights, all of which were launched from Site 110, and all of which failed before the first stage had completed its burn.

The first launch from the complex occurred from Site 110/38 on 21 February 1969, and was followed by another launch from the same pad on 3 July 1969. During the second launch the number 8 engine exploded a quarter of a second after liftoff, starting a fire at the base of the rocket. The rocket cleared the tower but by 12 seconds into the flight the fire had caused all but one of the remaining engines to fail, and the rocket fell back onto the launch pad. The resulting explosion destroyed the right pad, shattered windows six kilometres from the pad, and could be seen 35 kilometres (22 mi) away in Leninsk. It took over eighteen months to rebuild the pad.

N1 launches resumed on 26 June 1971, with the first from the left pad. Following its failure, and the failure of another launch on 23 November 1972, the development of the N1 was abandoned.

=== Energia ===
Both N1 pads at Site 110 were then rebuilt for launching Energia rockets and adapted for crewed flights. The two rotating service towers on both pads were reduced in height by 60 metres (200 feet) to match the shorter stack height of the Energia rocket. A third pad was constructed from the ground up at Site 250 for testing and uncrewed launches. Energia rockets only flew twice. The first flight (Energia-Polyus) on 15 May 1987 was made from Site 250, and the second flight (Energia-Buran) from Site 110/37.

The only Energia launch from Site 110 occurred at 03:00 UTC on 15 November 1988, carrying the first Buran shuttle on an uncrewed test flight.

=== Later use ===
Today both launch pads at Site 110 are still standing, but have fallen into disrepair. Site 110 was considered as a location for the Bayterek Launch Complex, which is to be built at Baikonur for Angara launches, however Baikonur's other Energia launch complex, Site 250, was chosen instead. Site 200/40, a Proton launch complex, had also been under consideration.
