= Baikonur Cosmodrome =

Spaceport in Kazakhstan leased to Russia

Baikonur Cosmodrome Байқоңыр ғарыш айлағы (Kazakh) Космодром Байконур (Russian)
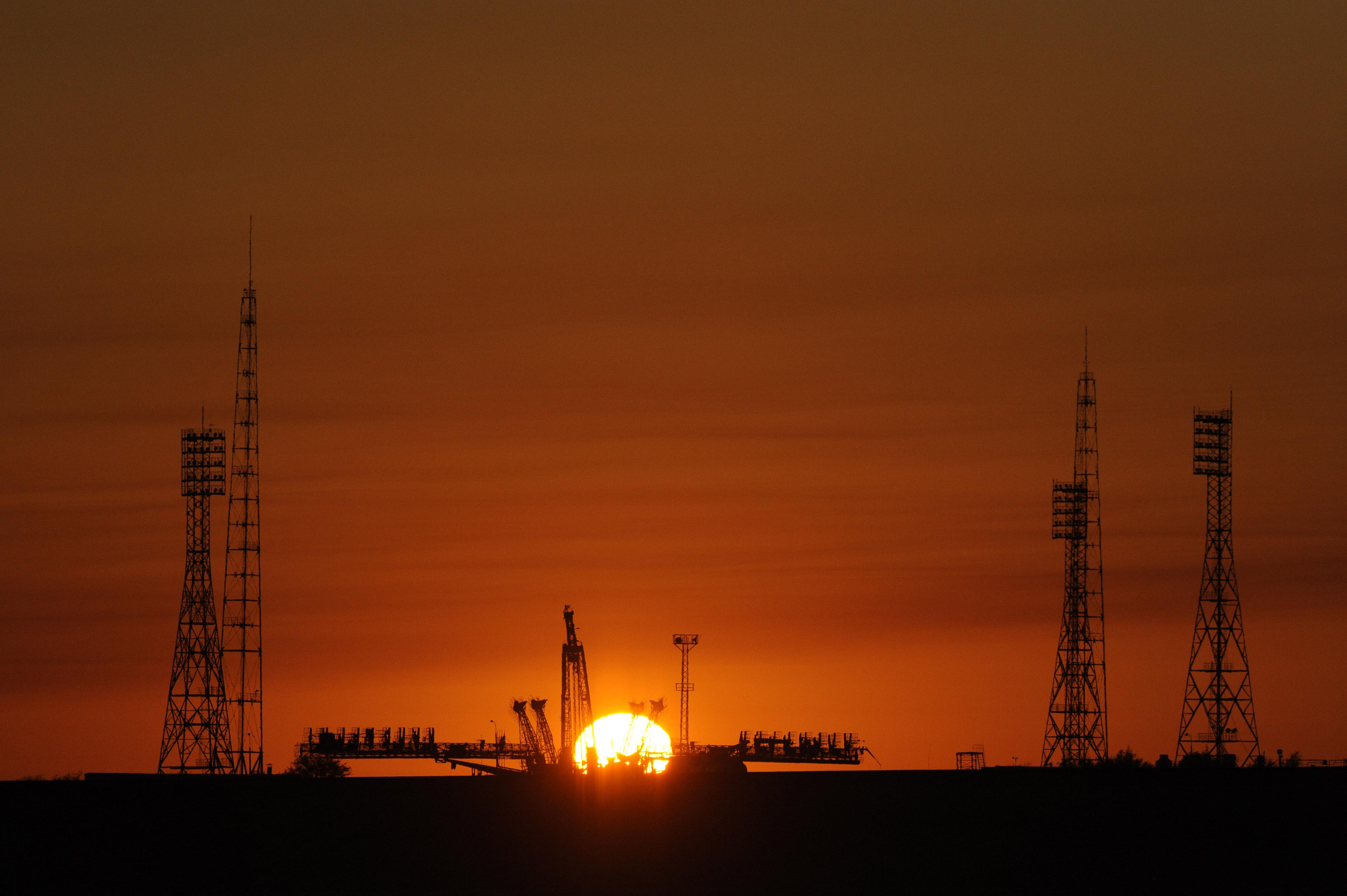
- The Cosmodrome's "Gagarin's Start" launchpad on 10 October 2008, prior to the rollout of Soyuz TMA-13
- IATA: none; ICAO: none; LID: GC0015

Summary
- Airport type: Spaceport
- Owner/Operator: Roscosmos; Russia
- Location: Baikonur, Kazakhstan
- Built: 1955; 71 years ago
- Time zone: AQTT (UTC+05:00)
- Elevation AMSL: 90 m (300 ft)
- Coordinates: 45.965°N 63.305°E
- Website: baikonurtour.com

Map
- Location in Kazakhstan Location relative to Russia (leased until 2050) Location in the former Soviet Union

The Baikonur Cosmodrome (Note: Kazakh: Байқоңыр ғарыш айлағы, romanized: Baiqoñyr ğaryş ailağy [bɑjqoˈŋɤr ʁɑˈrəʃ ɑjɫɑˈʁə]; Russian: Космодром Байконур, romanized: Kosmodrom Baykonur [kəsmɐˈdrom bəjkɐˈnur]) is a spaceport operated by Russia within Kazakhstan. Located in the Kazakh city of Baikonur, it is the largest operational space launch facility in terms of area. All Russian crewed spaceflights are launched from Baikonur.

Situated in the Kazakh Steppe, some 90 metres (300 ft) above sea level, it is 200 kilometres (120 mi) to the east of the Aral Sea and 33 kilometres (21 mi) north of the Syr Darya. It is close to Töretam, a station on the Trans-Aral Railway. Russia, as the official successor state to the Soviet Union, has retained control over the facility since 1991; it originally assumed this role through the post-Soviet Commonwealth of Independent States (CIS), but ratified an agreement with Kazakhstan in 2005 that allowed it to lease the spaceport until 2050. It is jointly managed by Roscosmos and the Russian Aerospace Forces.

In 1955, the Soviet Ministry of Defense issued a decree and founded the Baikonur Cosmodrome. It was originally built as the chief base of operations for the Soviet space program. The Cosmodrome served as the launching point for Sputnik 1 and Vostok 1. The launchpad used for both missions was renamed "Gagarin's Start" in honour of Soviet cosmonaut Yuri Gagarin, who piloted Vostok 1 and became the first human in outer space. As of 2015 under Russian management, Baikonur is a spaceport, with numerous commercial, military, and scientific missions being launched annually.

== History ==
=== Soviet era ===
The Soviet government issued Scientific Research Test Range No. 5 (NIIP-5; Russian: 5-й Научно-Исследовательский Испытательный Полигон, Pyatyy Nauchno-Issledovatel'skiy Ispytatel'nyy Poligon) on 12 February 1955. It was actually founded on 2 June 1955, originally a test center for the world's first intercontinental ballistic missile (ICBM), the R-7 Semyorka. NIIP-5 was soon expanded to include launch facilities for space flights. The site was selected by a commission led by General Vasily Voznyuk, influenced by Sergey Korolyov, the Chief Designer of the R-7 ICBM, and soon the man behind the Soviet space program. It had to be surrounded by plains, as the radio control system of the rocket required (at the time) receiving uninterrupted signals from ground stations hundreds of kilometres away. Additionally, the missile trajectory had to be away from populated areas. Also, it is advantageous to place space launch sites closer to the equator, as the surface of the Earth has higher rotational speed in such areas. Taking these constraints into consideration, the commission chose Tyuratam, a village in the heart of the Kazakh Steppe. The expense of constructing the launch facilities and the several hundred kilometres of new road and train lines made the Cosmodrome one of the most costly infrastructure projects undertaken by the Soviet Union. A supporting town was built around the facility to provide housing, schools, and infrastructure for workers. It was raised to city status in 1966 and named Leninsk (Russian: Ленинск).

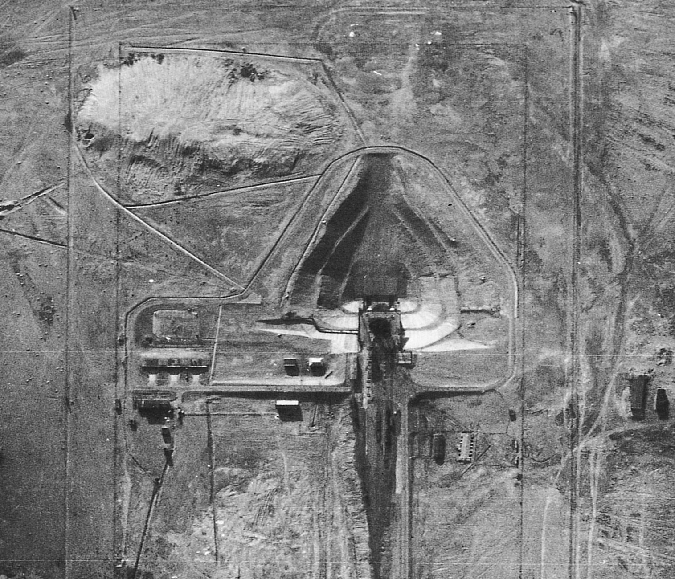
A U-2 spy plane photograph of R-7 launch pad in Tyuratam, taken on 5 August 1957

The American U-2 high-altitude reconnaissance plane found and photographed the Tyuratam missile test range for the first time on 5 August 1957.

In April 1975, in preparation for the Apollo-Soyuz Test Project, the first NASA astronauts were allowed to tour the cosmodrome. Upon their return to the United States, the crews commented that on their evening flight to Moscow they had seen lights on launch pads and related complexes for more than 15 minutes, and according to astronaut Thomas Stafford, "that makes Cape Kennedy look very small."

==== Name ====
According to most sources, the name Baikonur was deliberately chosen in 1961 (around the time of Gagarin's flight) to misdirect the Western Bloc to a place about 320 kilometres (200 mi) northeast of the launch center, the small mining town and railway station of Baikonur near Jezkazgan. Leninsk, the closed city built to support the cosmodrome, was renamed Baikonur on 20 December 1995 by Boris Yeltsin.

According to NASA's history of the Apollo-Soyuz Test Project, the name Baikonur was not chosen to misdirect, but was the name of the Tyuratam region before the establishment of the cosmodrome.

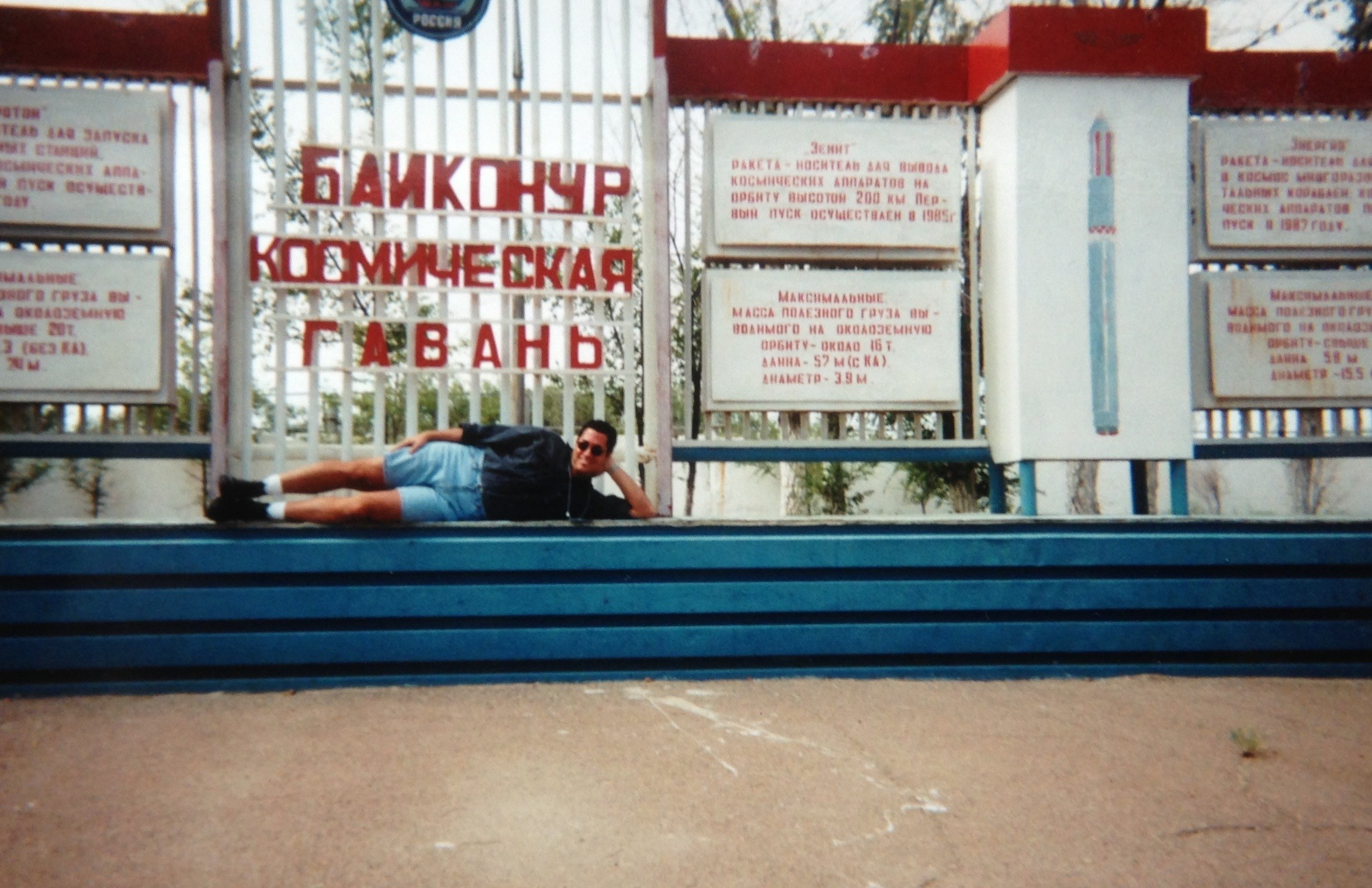
One of the main gates at Baikonur Cosmodrome spaceport in Kazakhstan

==== Environmental impact ====
Russian scientist Afanasiy Ilich Tobonov researched mass animal deaths in the 1990s and concluded that the mass deaths of birds and wildlife in the Sakha Republic were noted only along the flight paths of space rockets launched from the Baikonur cosmodrome. Dead wildlife and livestock were usually incinerated, and the participants in these incinerations, including Tobonov himself, his brothers and inhabitants of his native village of Eliptyan, commonly died from stroke or cancer. In 1997, the Ministry of Defense of the Russian Federation changed the flight path and removed the ejected rocket stages near Nyurbinsky District, Russia.

Scientific literature collected data that indicated adverse effects of rockets on the environment and the health of the population. UDMH, a fuel used in some Russian rocket engines, is highly toxic. It is one of the reasons for acid rain and increased cancers in the local population near the cosmodrome. Valery Yakovlev, a head of the laboratory of ecosystem research of the State scientific-production union of applied ecology "Kazmechanobr", notes: "Scientists have established the extreme character of the destructive influence of the "Baikonur" space center on environment and population of the region: 11,000 tons of space scrap metal, polluted by especially toxic UDMH is still laying on the falling grounds". Scrap recovery is part of the local economy.

==== Importance ====
Many historic flights lifted off from Baikonur: the first operational ICBM; the first man-made satellite, Sputnik 1, on 4 October 1957; the first spacecraft to travel close to the Moon, Luna 1, on 2 January 1959; the first crewed and orbital flight by Yuri Gagarin on 12 April 1961; and the flight of the first woman in space, Valentina Tereshkova, in 1963. 14 cosmonauts of 13 other nations, including Czechoslovakia, East Germany, India and France launched from Baikonur under the Interkosmos program as well. In 1960, a prototype R-16 ICBM exploded before launch, killing over 100 people. Baikonur is also the site from which Venera 9 and Mars 3 were launched.

=== Post-Soviet era ===
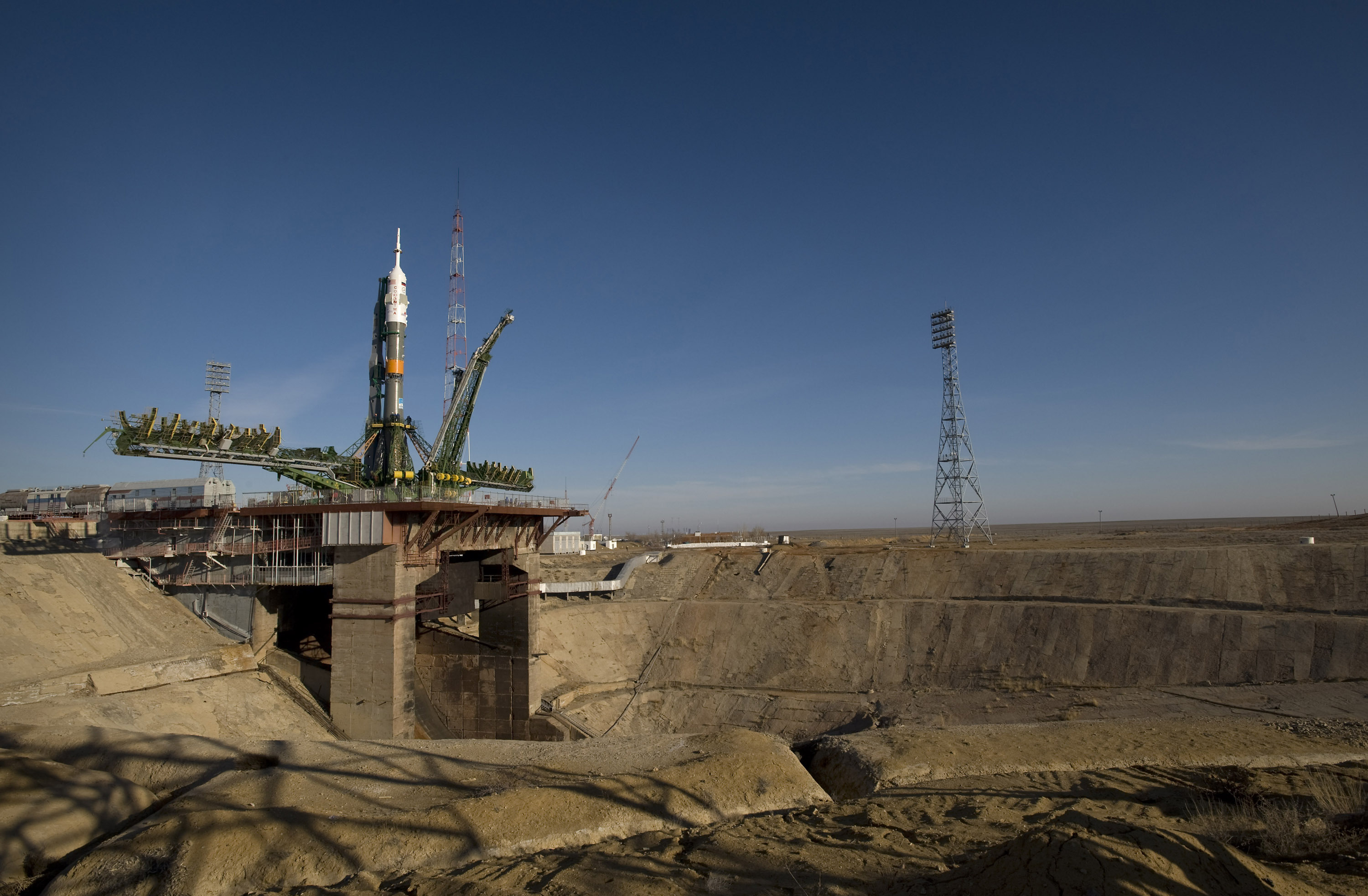
A Soyuz rocket is erected into position at the Baikonur Cosmodrome's Pad 1/5 (Gagarin's Start) on 24 March 2009. The rocket launched the crew of Expedition 19 and a spaceflight participant on 26 March 2009.

Following the dissolution of the Soviet Union in 1991, the Russian space program continued to operate from Baikonur under the auspices of the Commonwealth of Independent States. Russia wanted to sign a 99-year lease for Baikonur, but agreed to a US$115 million annual lease of the site for 20 years with an option for a 10-year extension. On 8 June 2005, the Russian Federation Council ratified an agreement between Russia and Kazakhstan extending Russia's rent term of the spaceport until 2050. The rent price – which remained fixed at US$115,000,000 per year – is the source of a long-running dispute between the two countries. In an attempt to reduce its dependency on Baikonur, Russia built the Vostochny Cosmodrome in Amur Oblast.

Baikonur has been a major part of Russia's contribution to the International Space Station (ISS), as it is the only spaceport from which Russian missions to the ISS are launched. It is primarily the border's position (but to a lesser extent Baikonur's position at about the 46th parallel north) that led to the 51.6° orbital inclination of the ISS; the lowest inclination that can be reached by Soyuz boosters launched from Baikonur without flying over China. With the conclusion of NASA's Space Shuttle program in 2011, Baikonur became the sole launch site used for crewed missions to the ISS until the launch of Crew Dragon Demo-2 in 2020.

In 2019, Gagarin's Start hosted three crewed launches, in March, July and September, before being shut down for modernisation for the new Soyuz-2 rocket with a planned first launch in 2023. The final launch from Gagarin's Start took place 25 September 2019. Gagarin's Start failed to receive funding (in part due to Russian invasion of Ukraine) to modernize it for the slightly larger Soyuz-2 rocket. In 2023, it was announced that the Russian and Kazakhstan authorities plan to deactivate the site as a space launch pad and turn it into a museum (in part for tourism purposes).

On 7 March 2023, the Kazakh government seized control of the Baiterek launch complex, one of the launch sites at Baikonur Cosmodrome, banning numerous Russian officials from leaving the country and preventing the liquidation of assets by Roscosmos. One of the reasons for the seizure was due to Russia failing to pay a $29.7 million debt to the Kazakh government. The seizure came after Russia's relations with Kazakhstan became tense due to its ongoing invasion of Ukraine.

On 27 November 2025, one of the cosmodrome's launchpads at Site 31/6 sustained significant damage following the launch of the Soyuz MS-28 rocket carrying three cosmonauts to the International Space Station. On March 3, 2026, Roscosmos announced the restoration of the damaged launchpad.

== Features ==
Baikonur is fully equipped with facilities for launching both crewed and uncrewed spacecraft. It has supported several generations of Russian spacecraft: Soyuz, Proton, Tsyklon, Dnepr, Zenit and Buran.

Downrange from the launchpad, spent launch equipment is dropped directly on the ground in the Russian far east where it is salvaged by the workers and the local population.

=== List of launchpads ===
Major launchpads at Baikonur Cosmodrome
- Pad 1/5 (Gagarin's Start) (1957–2019): R-7, Vostok, Voskhod, Molniya, Soyuz – 45.920°N 63.342°E
- Pad 31/6: R-7A, Vostok, Voskhod, Molniya, Soyuz, Soyuz-2 – 45.996°N 63.564°E
- Pad 41/3: R-16 (Destroyed in 1960 explosion) – 45.975°N 63.660°E
- Pad 41/4 : R-16 (1961–67) – 45.976°N 63.665°E
- Pad 41/15: R-16, Kosmos 3 (1963–68) – 45.976°N 63.669°E
- Pad 45/1: Zenit-2, Zenit-2M, Zenit-3M – 45.943°N 63.653°E
- Pad 45/2 (Destroyed in 1990 explosion): Zenit 2 – 45.940°N 63.655°E
- Pad 51: R-9 (1961–62) – 45.924°N 63.341°E
- Pad 60/6: R-16 (1963–66) – 46.019°N 64.016°E
- Pad 60/7: R-16 (1963–67) – 46.018°N 64.018°E
- Pad 60/8: R-16 (1962–66) – 46.017°N 64.018°E
- Pad 67/21: Tsyklon, R-36M, R-36O, MR-UR-100 Sotka (1963–72) – 45.989°N 63.705°E
- Pad 67/22: Tsyklon, R-36, R-36O (1964–66) – 45.990°N 63.707°E
- Pad 69: Tsyklon-2
- Pad 70 (Destroyed in 1963 explosion): R-9 – 46.033°N 63.096°E
- Pad 75: R-9 – 45.963°N 63.202°E
- Pad 80/17: Tsyklon (1965) – 46.007°N 64.020°E
- Pad 81/23 (81L) (inactive >2004): Proton-K – 46.074°N 62.978°E
- Pad 81/24 (81P): Proton-K, Proton-M – 46.071°N 62.985°E
- Pad 90/19 (90L) (inactive >1997): UR-200, Tsyklon-2 – 46.081°N 62.932°E
- Pad 90/20 (90R) (inactive >2006): UR-200, Tsyklon-2 – 46.080°N 62.935°E
- Pad 101: R-36M (1973–76) – 45.951°N 63.427°E
- Pad 102: R-36M (1978) – 45.933°N 63.435°E
- Pad 103: R-36M (1973–77) – 45.952°N 63.445°E
- Pad 104: R-36M (1972–74) – 45.988°N 63.420°E
- Pad 105: R-36M (1974–77) – 45.950°N 63.496°E
- Pad 106: R-36M (1974–83) – 45.951°N 63.497°E
- Pad 107: R-36 – 46.237°N 63.892°E
- Pad 108: R-36 – 46.239°N 63.895°E
- Pad 109/95: R-36M, Dnepr – 45.951°N 63.497°E
- Pad 110/37 (110L) (inactive >1988): N1, Energia-Buran – 45.965°N 63.305°E
- Pad 110/38 (110R) (inactive >1969): N1 – 45.962°N 63.310°E
- Pad 130: UR-100 (1965) – 46.086°N 62.916°E
- Pad 131: UR-100N, UR-100, Rokot (1965–90) – 46.072°N 62.956°E
- Pad 132: UR-100NU (2001–02) – 46.037°N 63.048°E
- Pad 140/18: R-36 (1965–78) – 45.997°N 63.553°E
- Pad 141: R-36 – 45.910°N 63.349°E
- Pad 142/34: R-36 (three silo complex) – 45.941°N 63.462°E
- Pad 160: R-36O – 46.078°N 62.942°E
- Pad 161/35: Tsyklon (1967–73) – 46.034°N 63.063°E
- Pad 162/36: Tsyklon (1966–75) – 46.032°N 63.067°E
- Pad 163: R-36O – 46.014°N 63.169°E
- Pad 164: R-36O – 45.944°N 63.064°E
- Pad 165: R-36O – 45.991°N 62.919°E
- Pad 170: UR-MR-100 (1976–79) – 45.948°N 63.026°E
- Pad 171: UR-100, UR-100N – 46.104°N 63.008°E
- Pad 172: UR-MR-100 (1978–81) – 46.065°N 63.092°E
- Pad 173: UR-MR-100 (1972–78) – 46.029°N 63.131°E
- Pad 174: UR-100, UR-100K – 46.082°N 62.918°E
- Pad 175/2: UR-100NU, Rokot, Strela – 46.051°N 62.987°E
- Pad 175/59: Rokot, Strela – 46.052°N 62.986°E
- Pad 176: UR-100 – 46.023°N 63.046°E
- Pad 177: UR-MR-100, UR-MR-100U (1973–78) – 45.980°N 63.100°E
- Pad 178: UR-100 – 46.025°N 62.891°E
- Pad 179: UR-100 – 45.989°N 62.964°E
- Pad 181: UR-MR-100U (1978–79) – 46.057°N 63.032°E
- Pad 191/66: R-36O (1969–71) – 45.970°N 63.197°E
- Pad 192: R-36O – 46.024°N 63.300°E
- Pad 193: R-36O – 45.953°N 63.389°E
- Pad 194: R-36O – 45.865°N 63.286°E
- Pad 195: R-36O – 45.793°N 63.275°E
- Pad 196: R-36O – 45.828°N 63.147°E
- Pad 200/39 (200L): Proton-M/Proton-K – 46.040°N 63.032°E
- Pad 200/40 (200R): Proton-K (inactive >1991) – 46.036°N 63.038°E
- Pad 241: R-36O – 45.858°N 63.456°E
- Pad 242: R-36O – 45.945°N 63.481°E
- Pad 243: R-36O – 45.855°N 63.737°E
- Pad 244: R-36O – 45.840°N 63.634°E
- Pad 245: R-36O – 45.818°N 63.527°E
- Pad 246: R-36O – 45.766°N 63.423°E
- Pad 250 (inactive >1987): Energia – 46.008°N 63.305°E

=== Buran facilities ===
As part of the Buran programme, several facilities were adapted or newly built for the Buran-class space shuttle orbiters:

- Site 110 – Used for the launch of the Buran-class orbiters. Like the assembly and processing hall at Site 112, the launch complex was originally constructed for the Soviet lunar landing program and later converted for the Energia-Buran program.
- Site 112 – Used for orbiter maintenance and to mate the orbiters to their Energia launchers (thus fulfilling a role similar to the VAB at KSC). The main hangar at the site, called MIK RN or MIK 112, was originally built for the assembly of the N1 Moon rocket. After cancellation of the N-1 program in 1974, the facilities at Site 112 were converted for the Energia-Buran program. It was here that orbiter 1K was stored after the end of the Buran program and was destroyed when the hangar roof collapsed in 2002.
- Site 251 – Used as Buran orbiter landing facility, also known as Yubileyniy Airfield (and fulfilling a role similar to the SLF at KSC). It features one runway, called 06/24, which is 4,500 metres (14,800 ft) long and 84 metres (276 ft) wide, paved with "Grade 600" high quality reinforced concrete. At the edge of the runway were two special mate–demate devices; PUA-100 was designed to lift Buran orbiters and complete Energia stages onto the Antonov An-225 Mriya carrier aircraft and the smaller PKU-50 was used with the Myasishchev VM-T Atlant and incomplete orbiters or segments of the Energia core stage. After arrival on one of the transport aircraft, an orbiter was loaded onto a transporter, which would carry the orbiter to the processing building at Site 254. A purpose-built orbiter landing control facility, housed in a large multi-store office building, was located near the runway. Yubileyniy Airfield was also used to receive heavy transport planes carrying elements of the Energia-Buran system. After the end of the Buran program, Site 251 was abandoned but later reopened as a commercial cargo airport. Besides serving Baikonur, Kazakh authorities also use it for passenger and charter flights from Russia.
- Site 254 – Built to service the Buran-class orbiters between flights (thus fulfilling a role similar to the OPF at KSC). Constructed in the 1980s as a special four-bay building, it also featured a large processing area flanked by several floors of test rooms. After cancellation of the Buran program it was adapted for pre-launch operations of the Soyuz and Progress spacecraft.

=== Intra-site railway ===
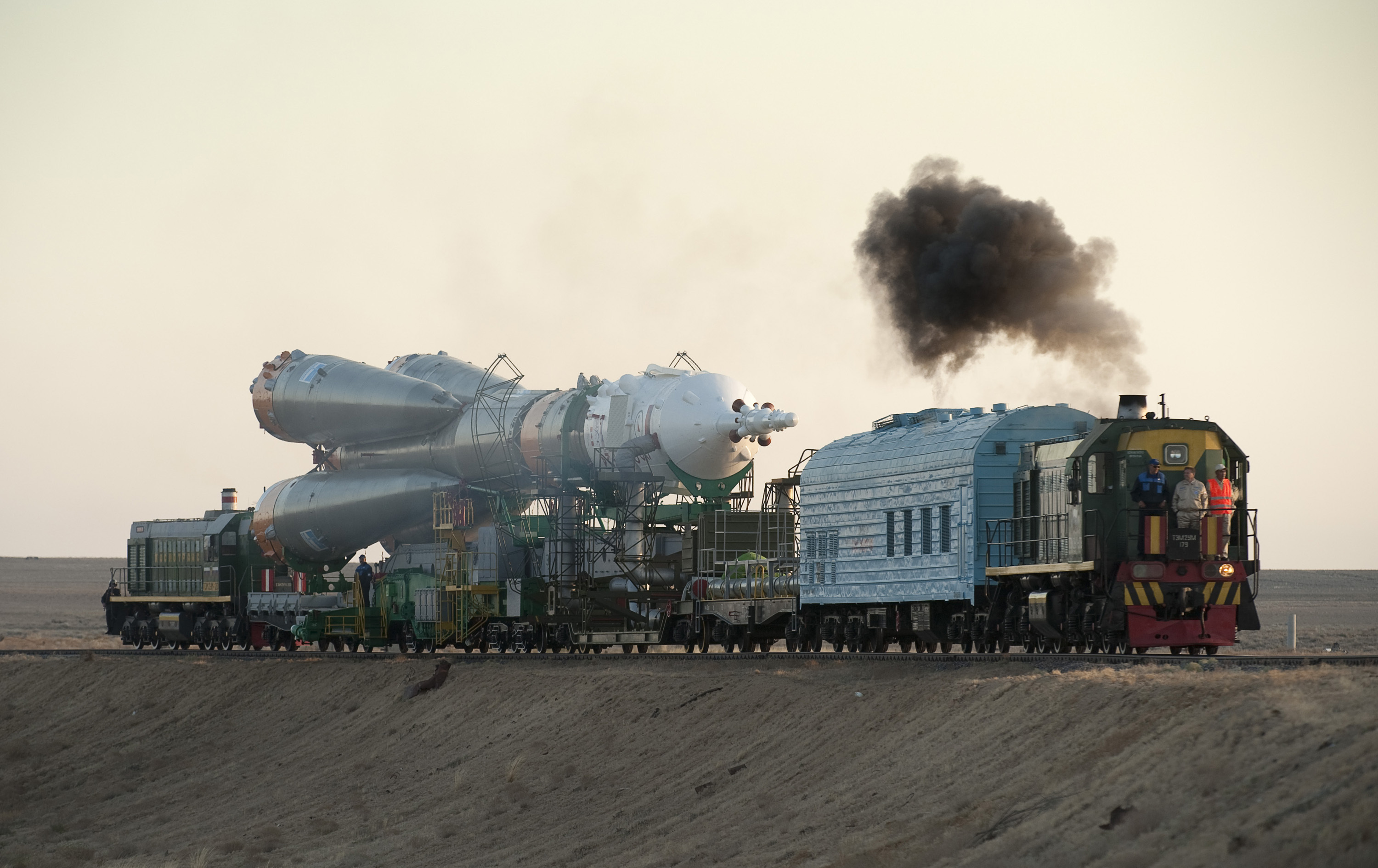
A Soyuz TMA-16 launch vehicle being transported to launchpad at Baikonur in 2009.

All Baikonur's logistics are based on its own intra-site 1,520 mm (4 ft 11 27/32 in) gauge railway network, which is the largest industrial railway on the planet. The railway is used for all stages of launch preparation, and all spacecraft are transported to the launchpads by the special Schnabel cars. Once part of the Soviet Railroad Troops, the Baikonur Railway is now served by a dedicated civilian state company. There are several rail links connecting the Baikonur Railway to the public railway of Kazakhstan and the rest of the world.

=== On-site airports ===
The Baikonur Cosmodrome has two on-site multi-purpose airports, serving both the personnel transportation needs and the logistics of space launches (including the delivery of the spacecraft by planes). There are scheduled passenger services from Moscow to the smaller Krayniy Airport (IATA: BXY, ICAO: UAOL), which however are not accessible to the public. The larger Yubileyniy Airport (Юбилейный аэропорт) (IATA: UAON) was where the Buran orbiter was transported to Baikonur on the back of the Antonov An-225 Mriya cargo aircraft.

== ICBM testing ==
Although Baikonur has always been known around the world as the launch site of Soviet and Russian space missions, from its outset in 1955 and until the collapse of the USSR in 1991 the primary purpose of this center was to test liquid-fueled ballistic missiles. The official (and secret) name of the center was State Test Range No. 5 or 5 GIK. It remained under the control of the Soviet and Russian Ministry of Defense until the second half of the 1990s, when the Russian civilian space agency and its industrial contractors started taking over individual facilities.

In 2006, the head of Roscosmos, Anatoly Perminov, said that the last Russian military personnel would be removed from the Baikonur facility by 2007. However, on 22 October 2008, an SS-19 Stiletto missile was test-fired from Baikonur, indicating this may not be the case.

== Future projects ==
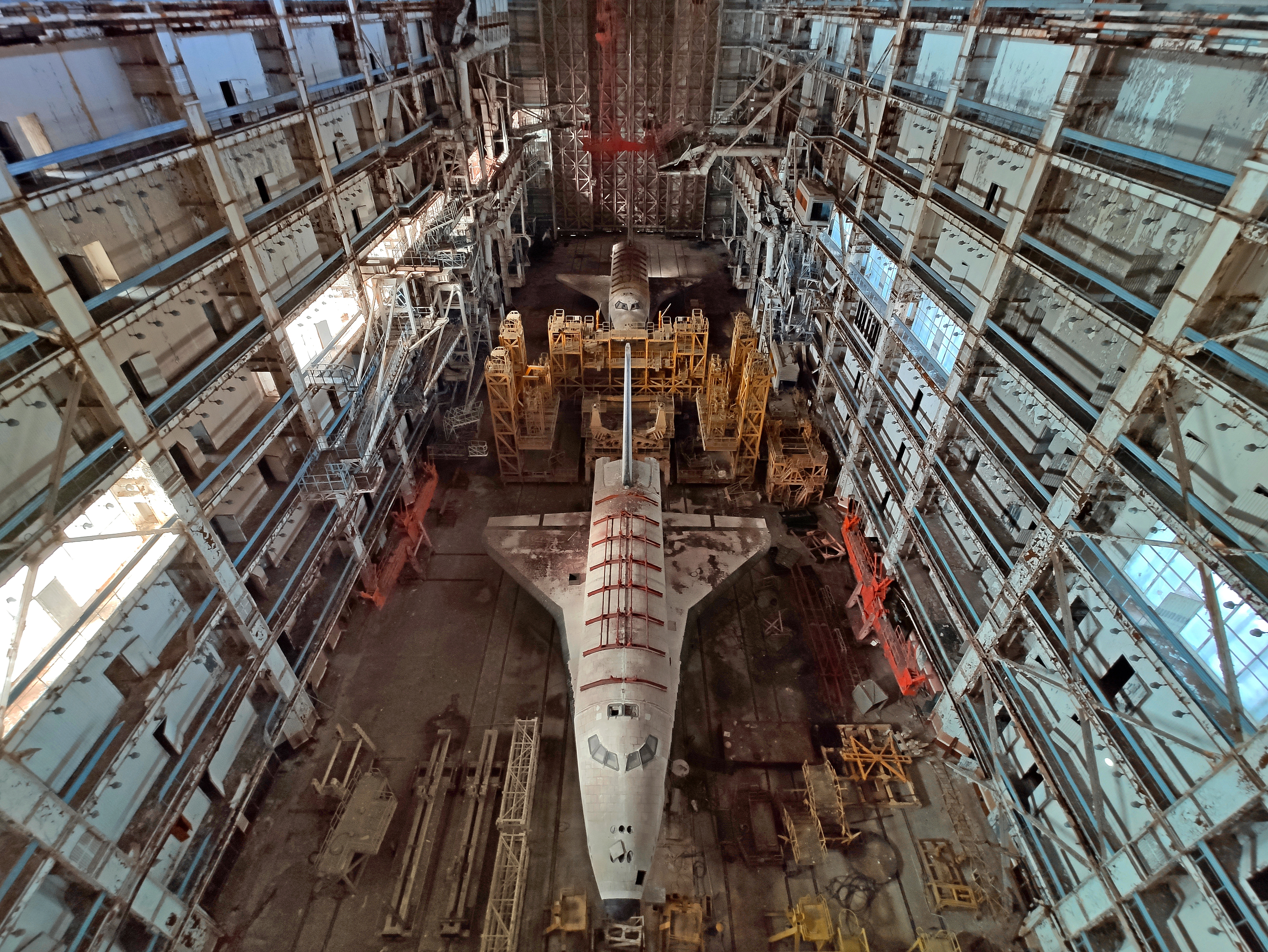
OK-MT (foreground) and OK-1.02 (background) in storage at Baikonur Cosmodrome in 2020.

On 22 December 2004, Kazakhstan and Russia signed a contract establishing the "Russia–Kazakhstan Baiterek JV" joint venture, in which each country holds a 50% stake. The goal of the project was the construction of the Bayterek ("poplar tree") space launch complex, to facilitate operations of the Russian Angara rocket launcher. This was anticipated to allow launches with a payload of 26 tons to low Earth orbit, compared to 20 tons using the Proton system. An additional benefit would be that the Angara uses kerosene as fuel and oxygen as the oxidiser, which is less hazardous to the environment than the toxic fuels used by older boosters. The total expenditure on the Kazakh side was expected to be US$223 million over 19 years. As of 2010, the project was stalling due to insufficient funding, but it was thought that the project still had good chances to succeed because it would allow both parties – Russia and Kazakhstan – to continue the joint use of Baikonur even after the construction of Vostochny Cosmodrome. As of 2025, the first test launch of the Baiterek Rocket and Space Complex is scheduled for December 2025.

== Baikonur Museum ==
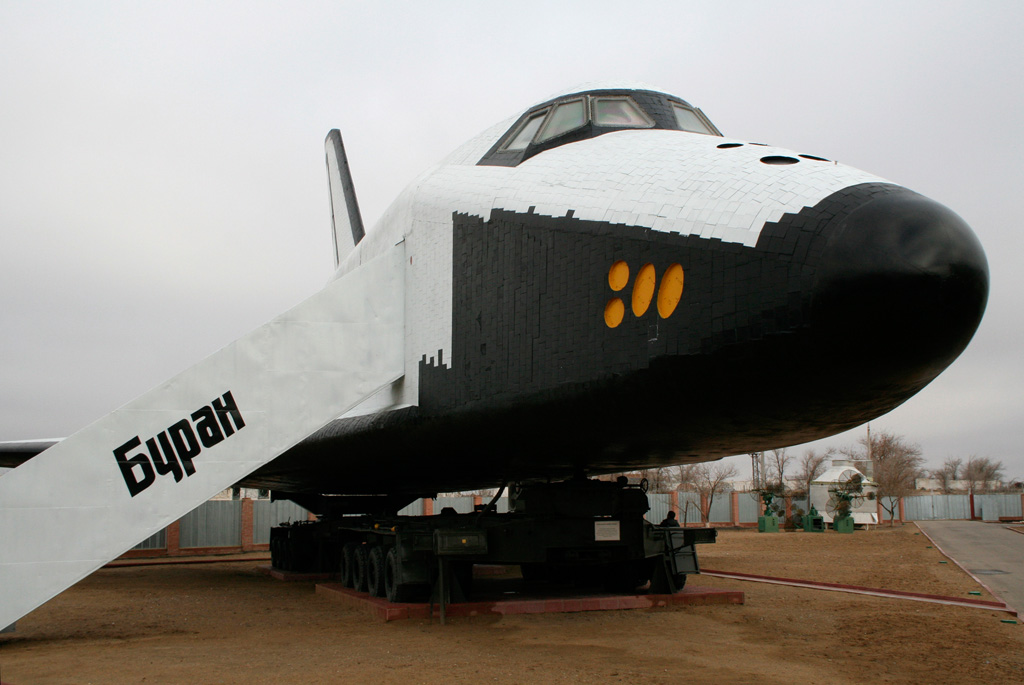
Buran test article OK-ML-1 at Baikonur Museum

The Baikonur Cosmodrome has a small museum, next to two small cottages, once residences of the rocket engineer Sergei Korolev and the first cosmonaut, Yuri Gagarin. Both cottages are part of the museum complex and have been preserved. The museum is home to a collection of space artefacts. A restored test article from the Soviet Buran programme sits next to the museum entrance. The only completed orbiter, which flew a single orbital test mission in 1988, was destroyed in a hangar collapse in 2002. For a complete list of surviving Buran vehicles and artefacts, see Buran programme § List of vehicles.

The museum also houses photographs related to the cosmodrome's history, including images of all cosmonauts. Every crew of every expedition launched from Baikonur leaves behind a signed crew photograph that is displayed behind the glass.

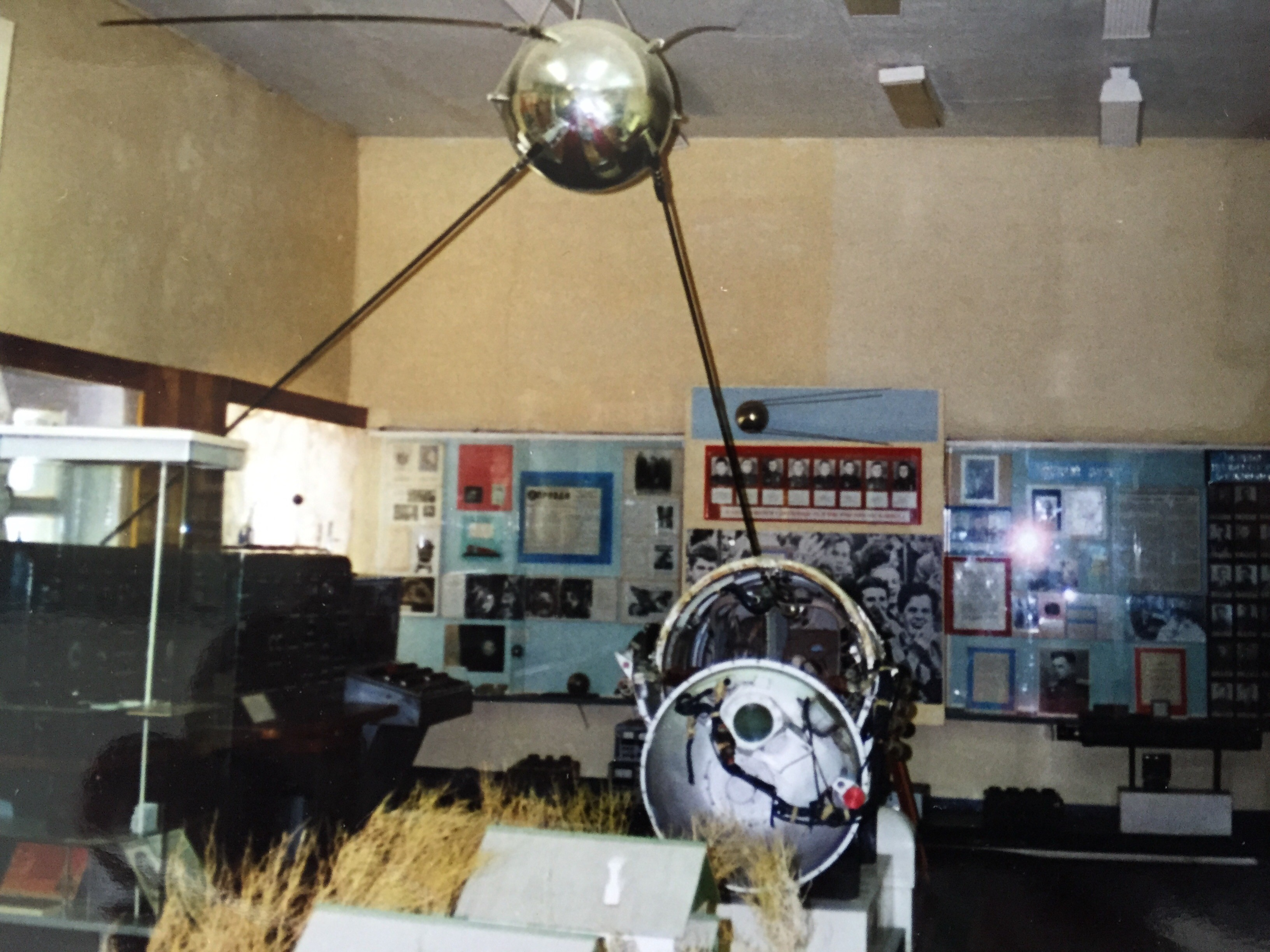
The Sputnik 1 satellite test model is shown at the Baikonur Cosmodrome Museum of Space History in Kazakhstan.

The entrance and checkpoint of Baikonur Cosmodrome near the Kazakh town of Toretam (Tyuratam)

Baikonur's museum holds many objects related to Gagarin, including the ground control panel from his flight, his uniforms, and soil from his landing site, preserved in a silver container. One of the museum rooms also holds an older version of the Soyuz descent capsule.

In 2021, the Baikonur space complex was named as one of the top 10 tourist destinations in Kazakhstan.

In 2023, a plan was announced to add the Gagarin's Start launch complex to the museum complex at Baikonur.

== See also ==
- Vostochny Cosmodrome
- Plesetsk Cosmodrome
- Svobodny Cosmodrome
- Kapustin Yar
