= IDA71 =

Russian military rebreather for underwater and high altitude use

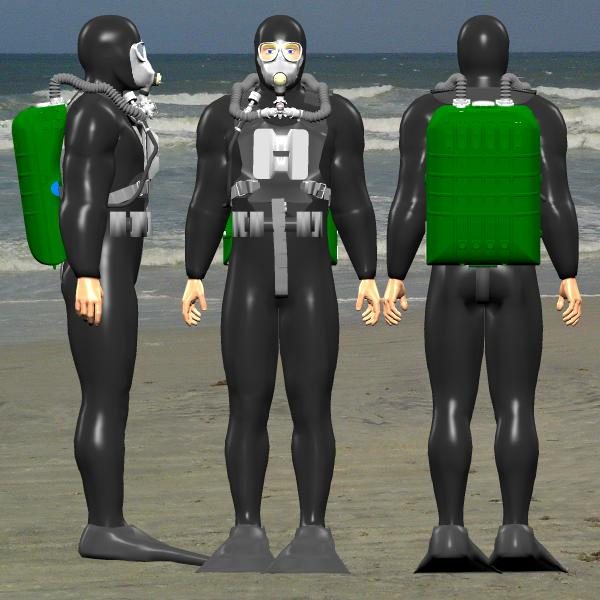
3 views of a frogman with IDA rebreather

The Soviet, later Russian IDA71 military and naval rebreather is an oxygen rebreather intended for use by naval and military divers including Russian commando frogmen. As supplied it is in a plain backpack harness with no buoyancy aid. The casing is pressed aluminium with a hinged cover. It has a small optional nitrox cylinder which can be clipped on its outside to convert it to nitrox mode. It contains one oxygen cylinder and two absorbent canisters. In the bottom of its casing is an empty space which is intended for an underwater communications set.

Here, "up", "back", etc. refer to a man wearing the set standing on land.

The casing is thinner towards the lower end, to reduce drag.

On the front of the harness of the navy frogman version there is a projecting metal plate intended to carry a limpet mine. The front of the harness is a tough rubber "apron".

The loop of each breathing tube can be strapped down to the shoulder to keep it under control to stop it from catching on things or being easily grabbed from behind.

On each side of the casing is a small clip to fasten a parachute to.

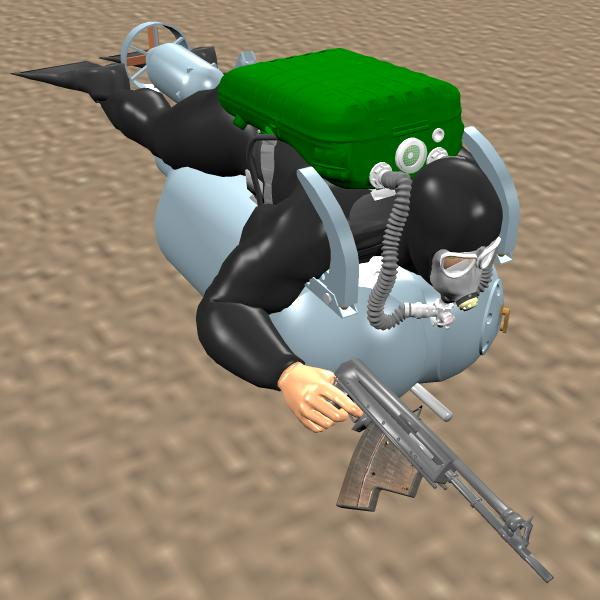
The IDA71 rebreather in action

== Operating modes ==
The IDA-71 can be used as an oxygen rebreather, or with the addition of an external cylinder, as a nitrox rebreather, which converts between nitrox and oxygen automatically by a pressure activated valve on the nitrox attachment.

It can run as an ordinary diving rebreather. Or it can be run with one of its two absorbent canisters filled with potassium superoxide, which gives off oxygen as it absorbs carbon dioxide: 4KO_{2} + 2CO_{2} = 2K_{2}CO_{3} + 3O_{2}; in this mode the oxygen cylinder is a bailout, or to fill and flush the circuit at the start of the dive. This mode gives the set more duration underwater, but is dangerous and not to be risked by civilians because of the explosively hot reaction that happens if water gets on the potassium superoxide; whereas ordinary modern diver's rebreather absorbents have been designed to avoid producing a caustic solution (commonly called "cocktail") if they get wet. Tests at the United States Navy Experimental Diving Unit in Panama City, Florida showed that the IDA71 could give significantly longer dive time with superoxide in one of the canisters than without.

For many years the IDA71 and similar have been a standard Russian frogman's and naval work diver's breathing set. The "71" in its name may be the year that it was designed, like with the numbers in the names of the AK series of Russian rifles. The name IDA comes from Russian: Изолирующий дыхательный аппарат (translit. izoliruyushchiy dykhatel'nyy apparat, literally Insulating/Isolating Breathing Apparatus). Other name is Individual Breathing Apparatus (Russian: Индивидуальный дыхательный аппарат, translit. Individualniy Dykhatelniy Apparat).

In its original Russian mode as an oxygen rebreather, its dive duration is said to be 4 hours. Filling both canisters with soda lime and putting a second oxygen cylinder in the empty space at the bottom, might increase its dive duration to 8 hours.

A number of IDA71's have found their way out of the ex-USSR to Europe and America, where recreational divers have added a wing buoyancy compensator and converted them into manually controlled closed circuit rebreathers.

== Gallery ==
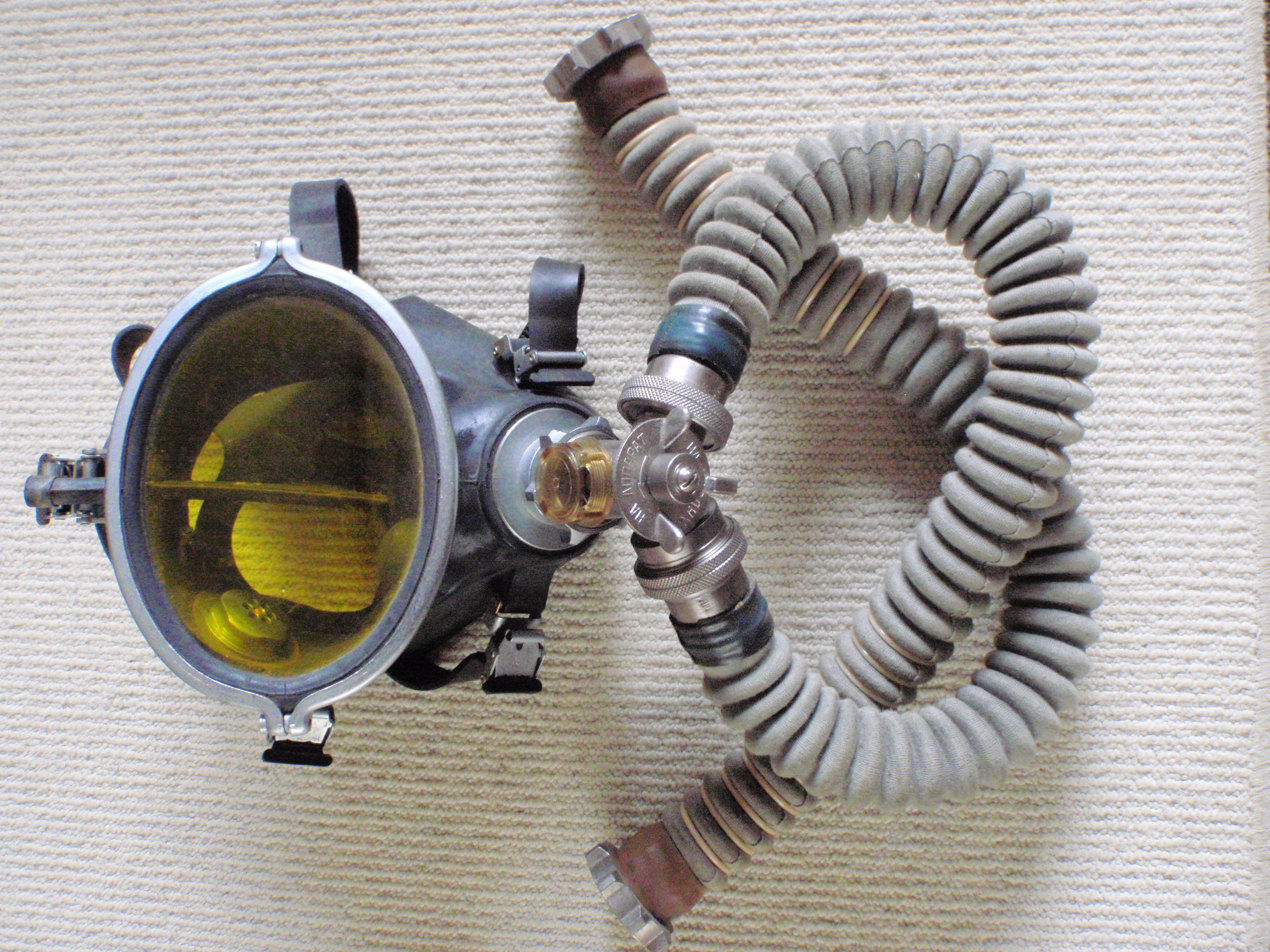
IDA-71 mask, DSV and breathing hoses

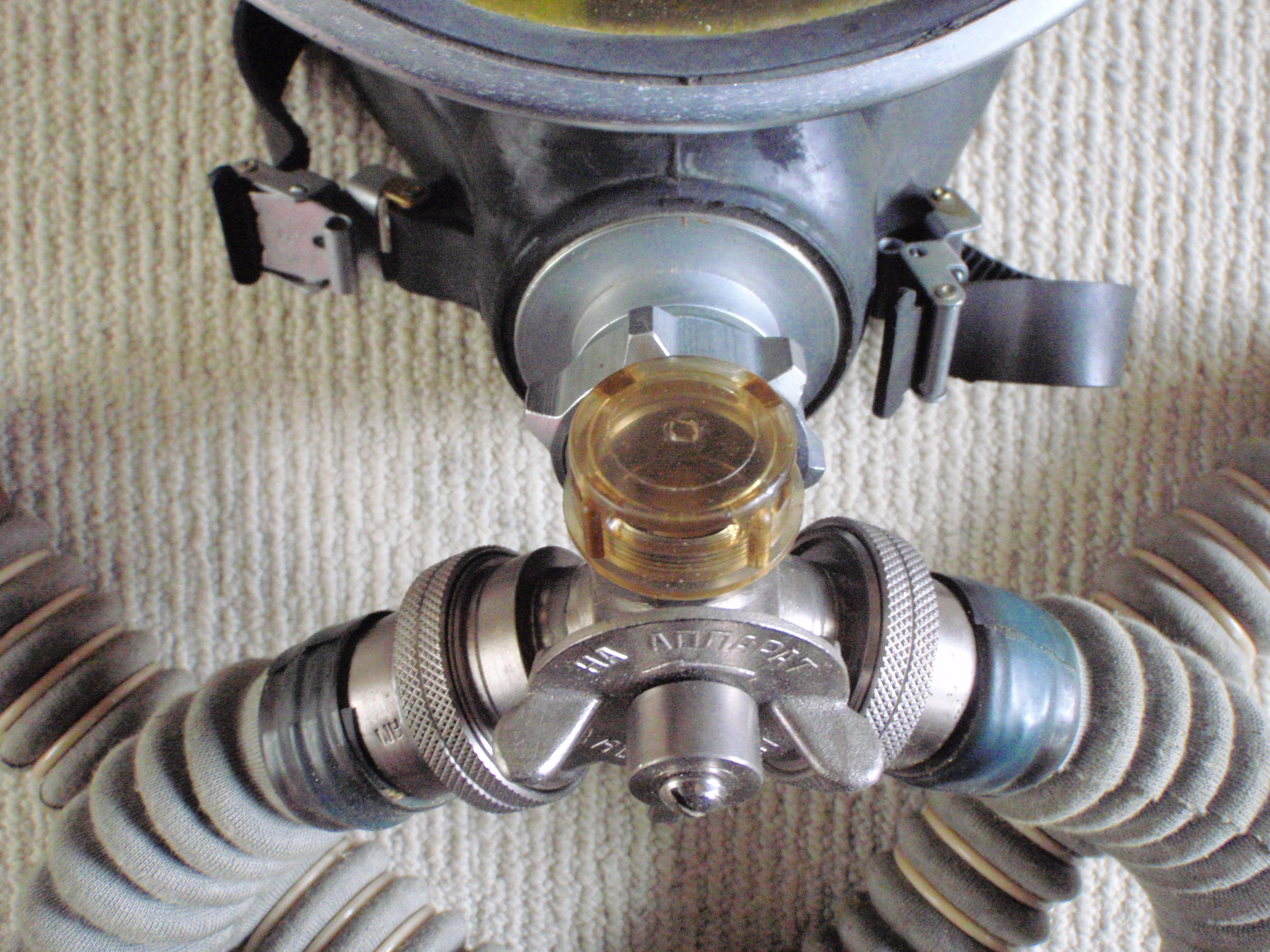
IDA-71 dive/surface valve

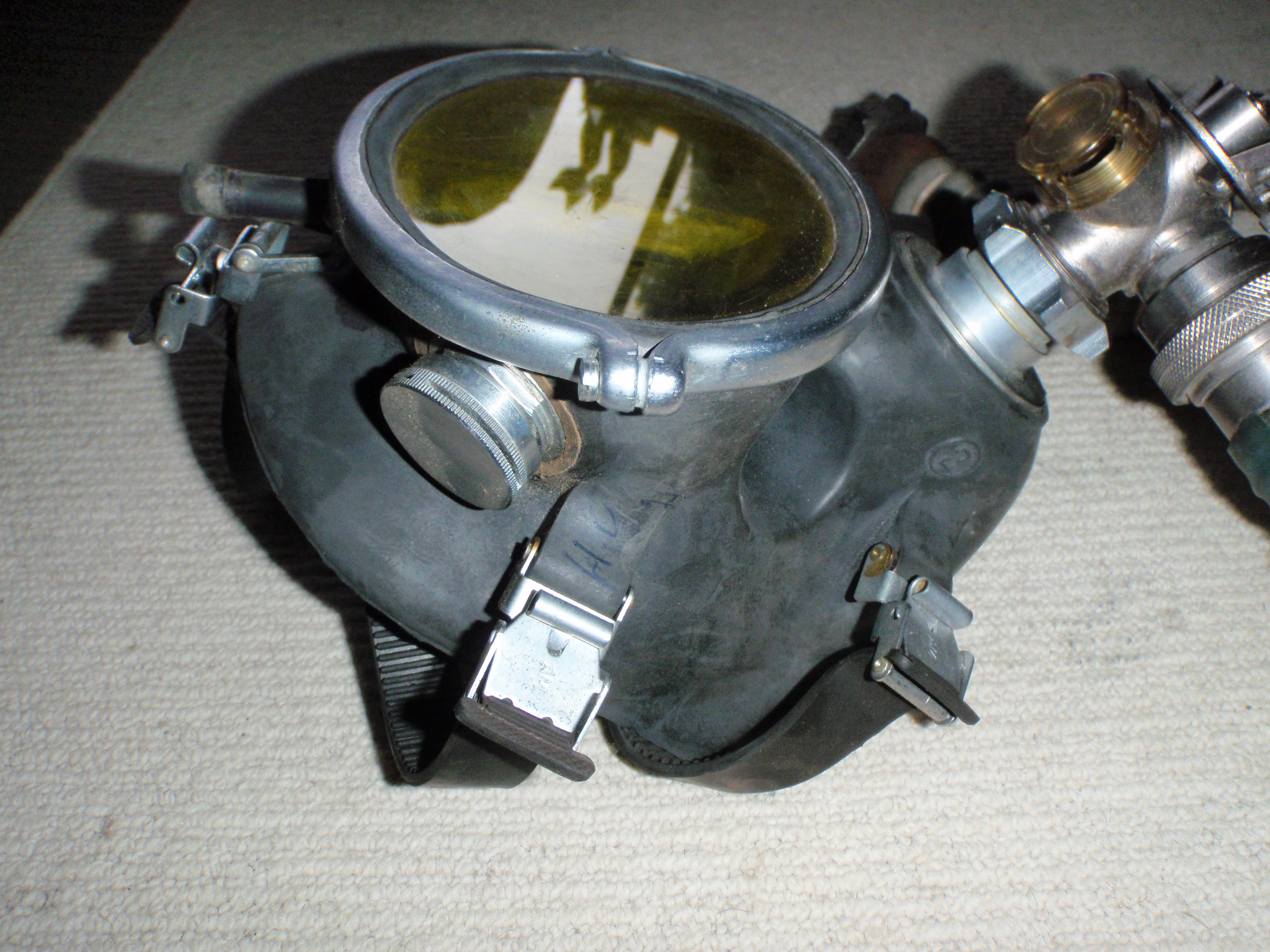
IDA-71 full face mask and DSV

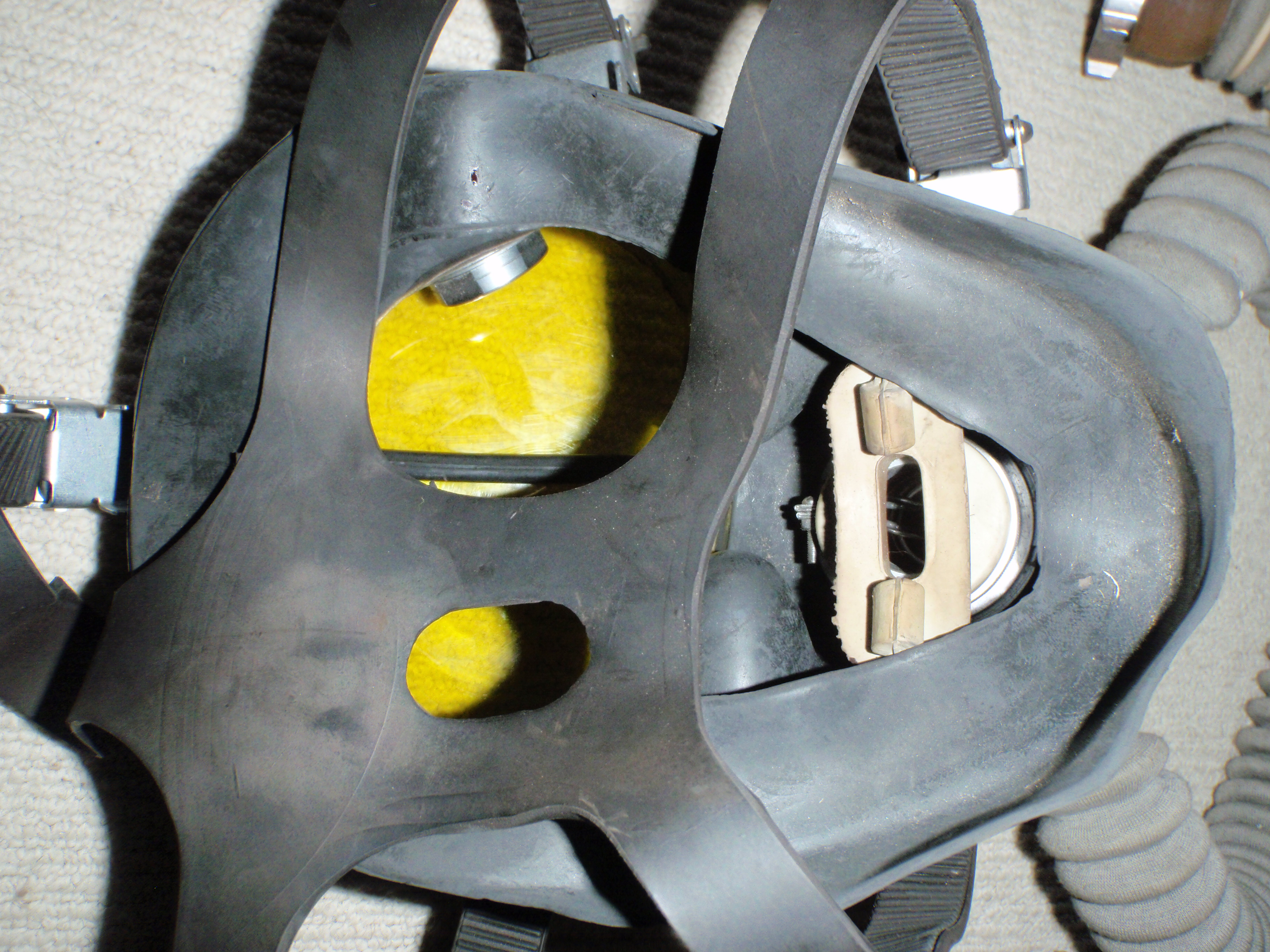
IDA-71 full face mask

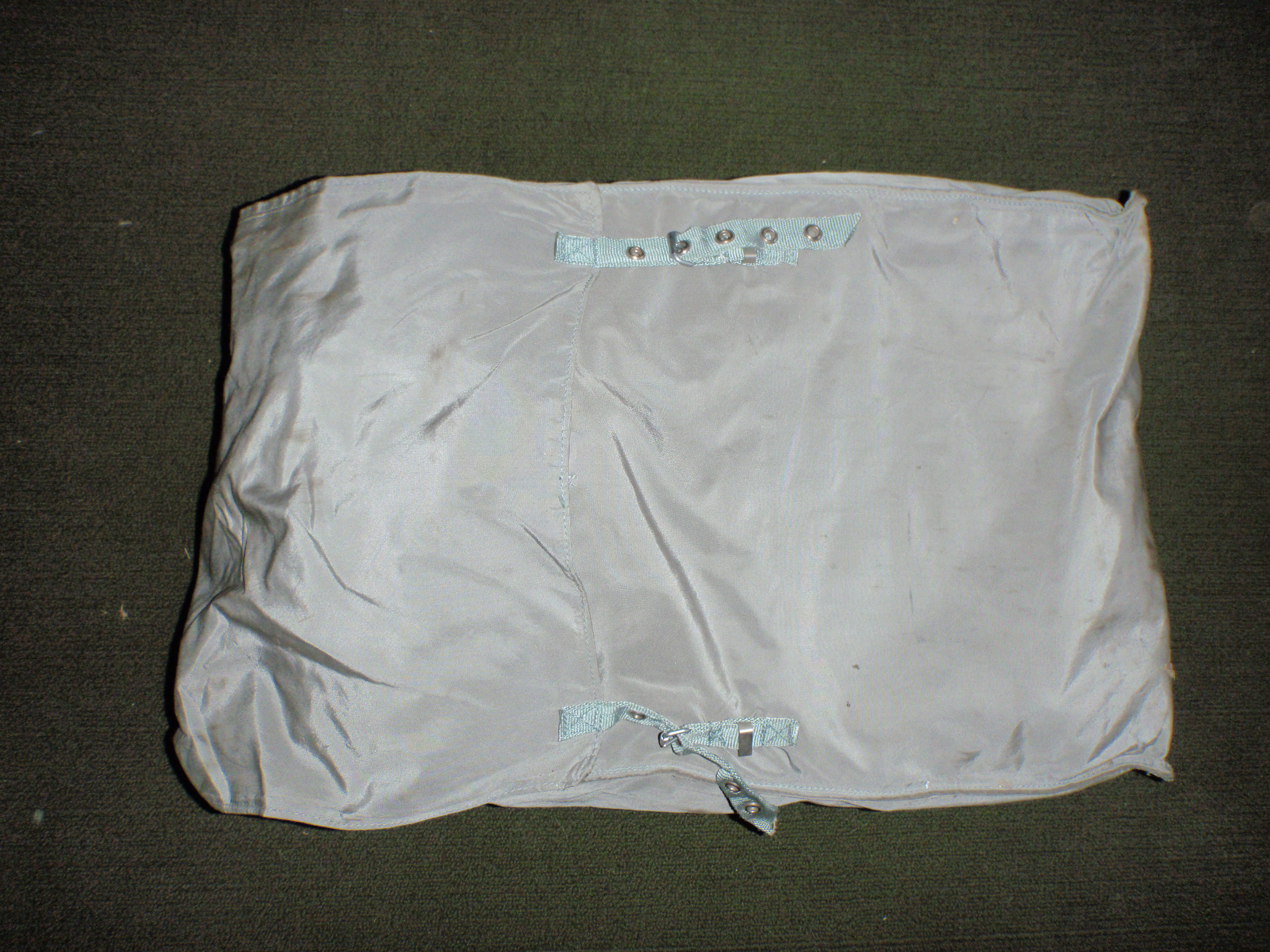
IDA-71 transport bag

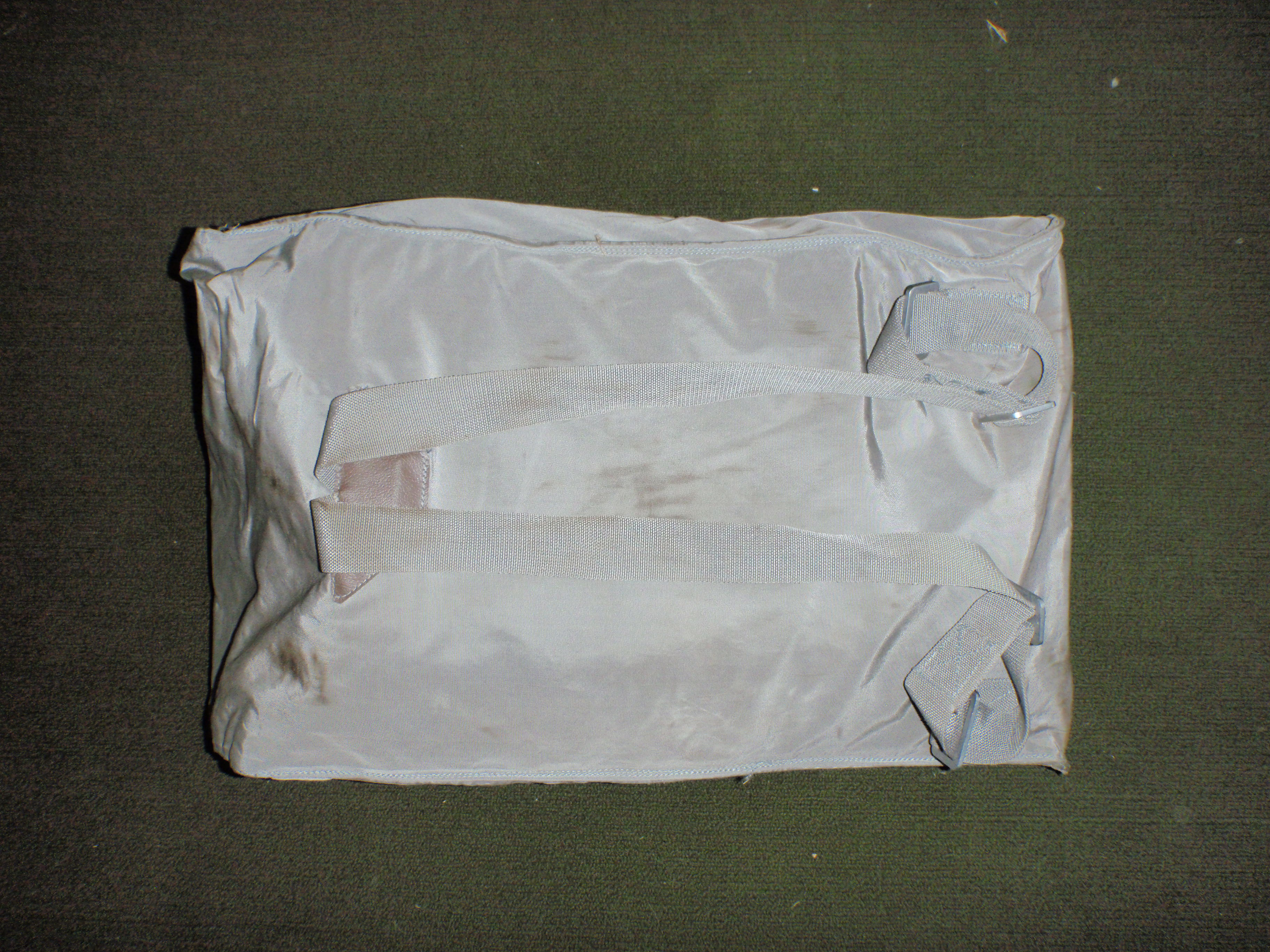
IDA-71 transport bag

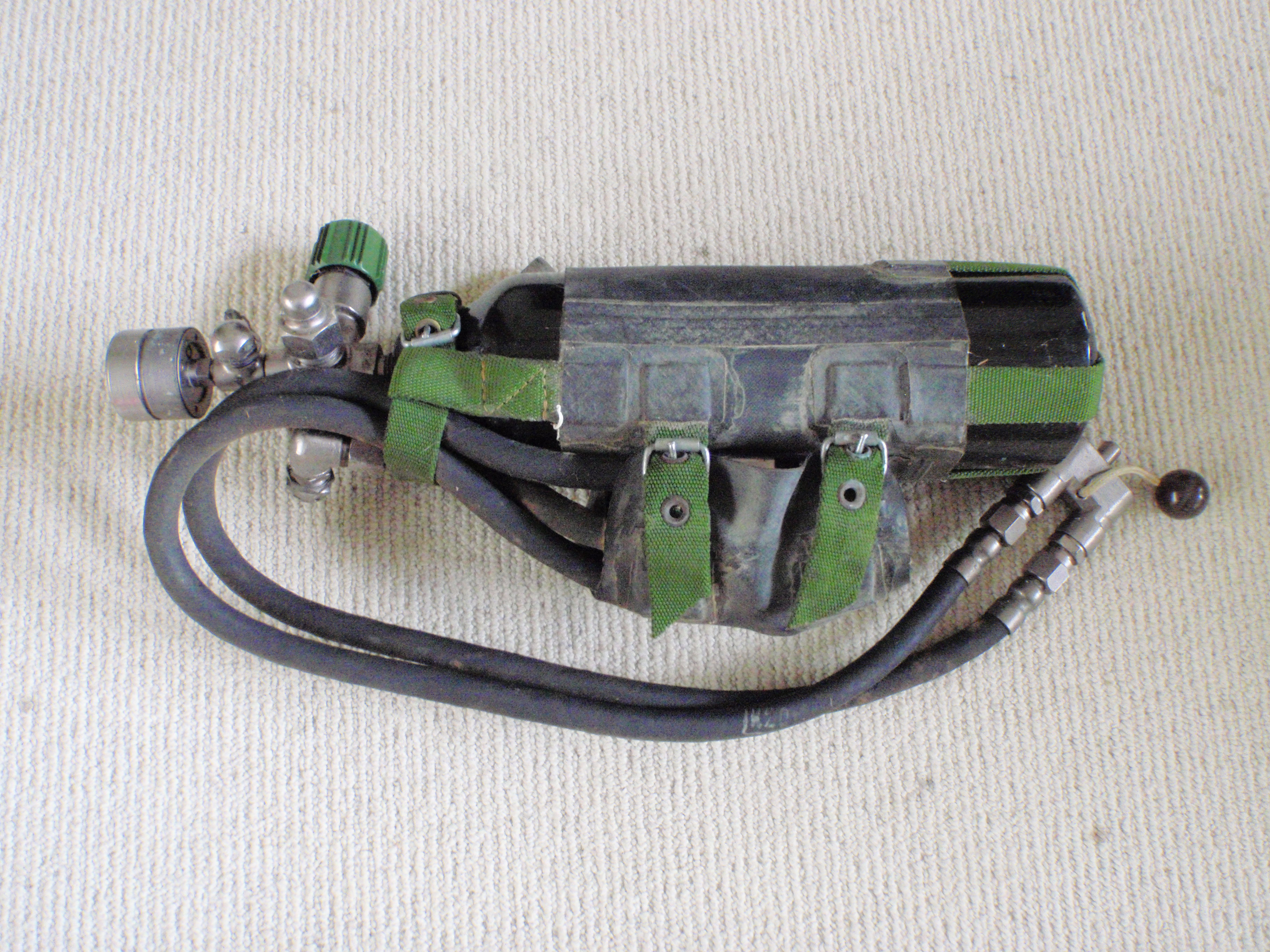
IDA-71 external nitrox cylinder with regulator hoses and changeover valve

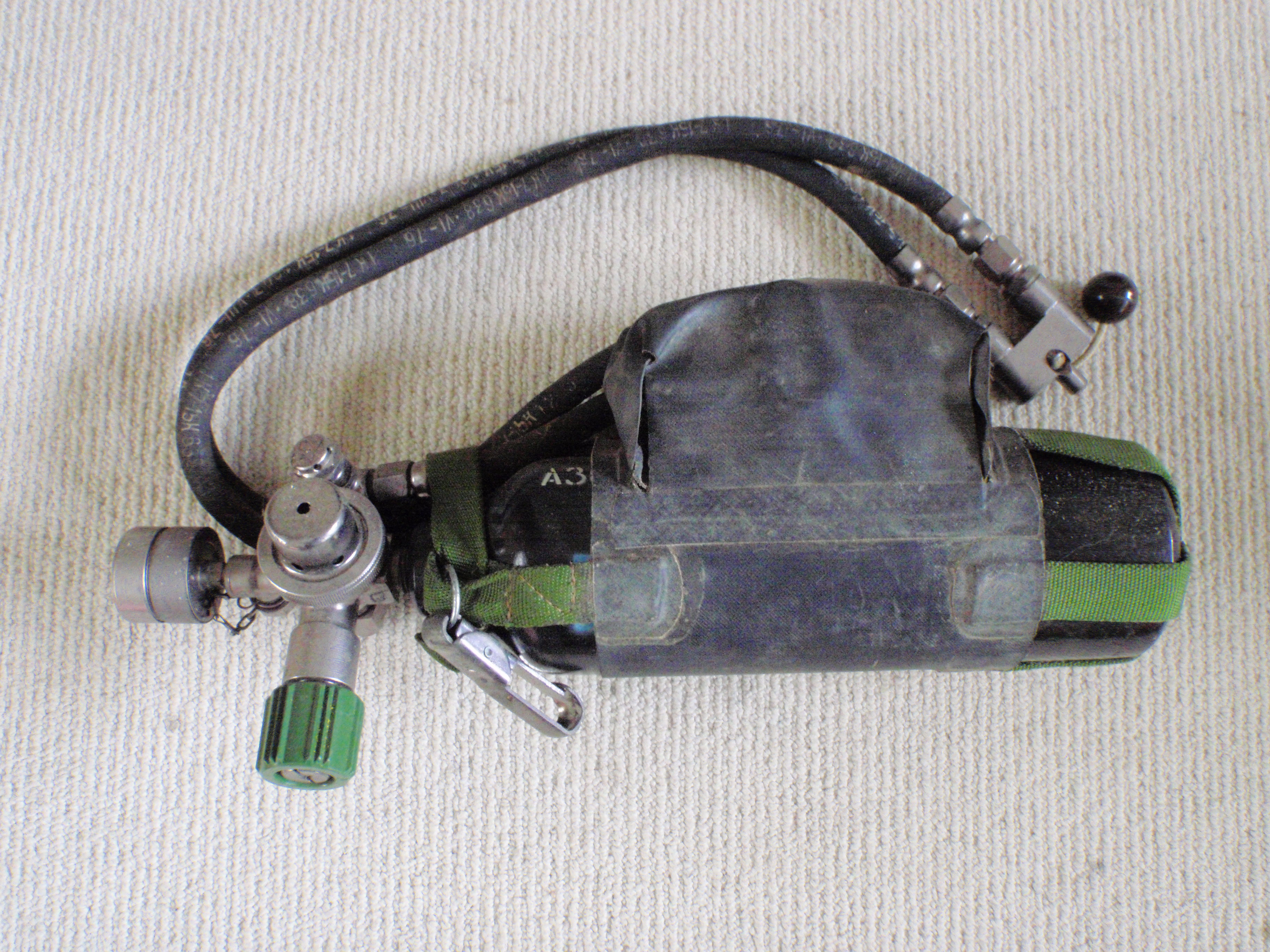
IDA-71 external nitrox cylinder with regulator hoses and changeover valve

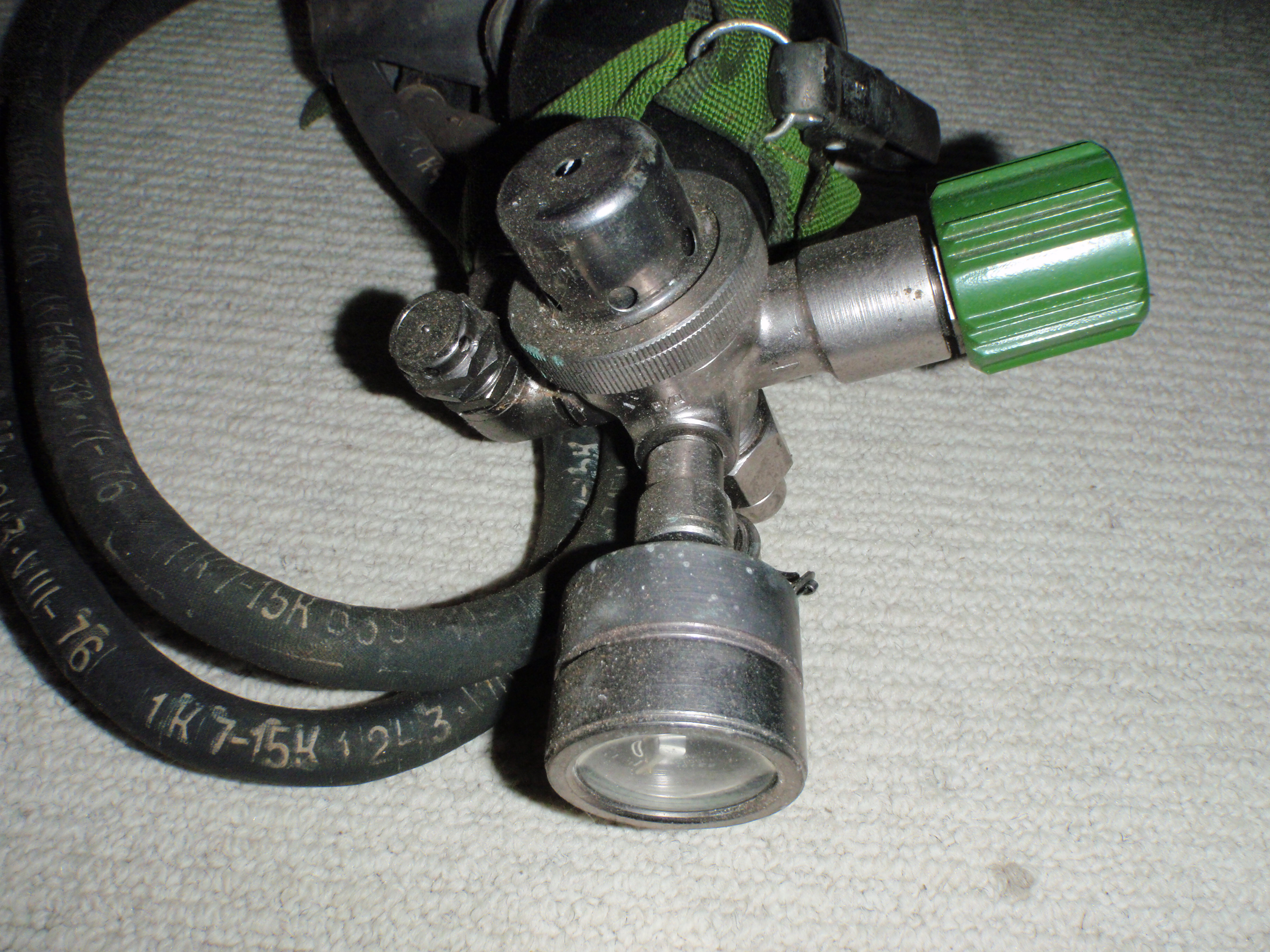
IDA-71 Integrated cylinder valve and regulator of external nitrox set

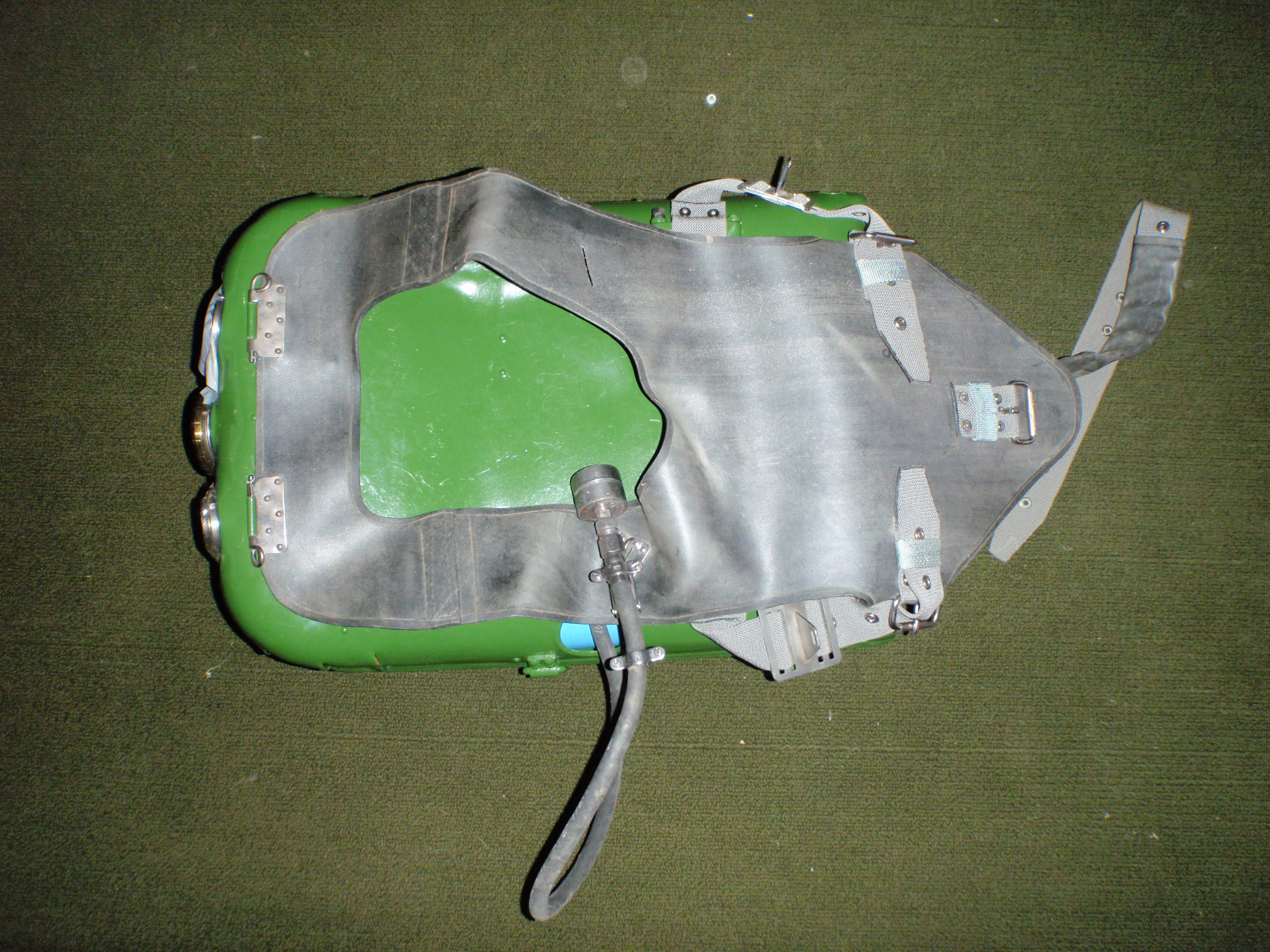
IDA 71 rebreather and harness

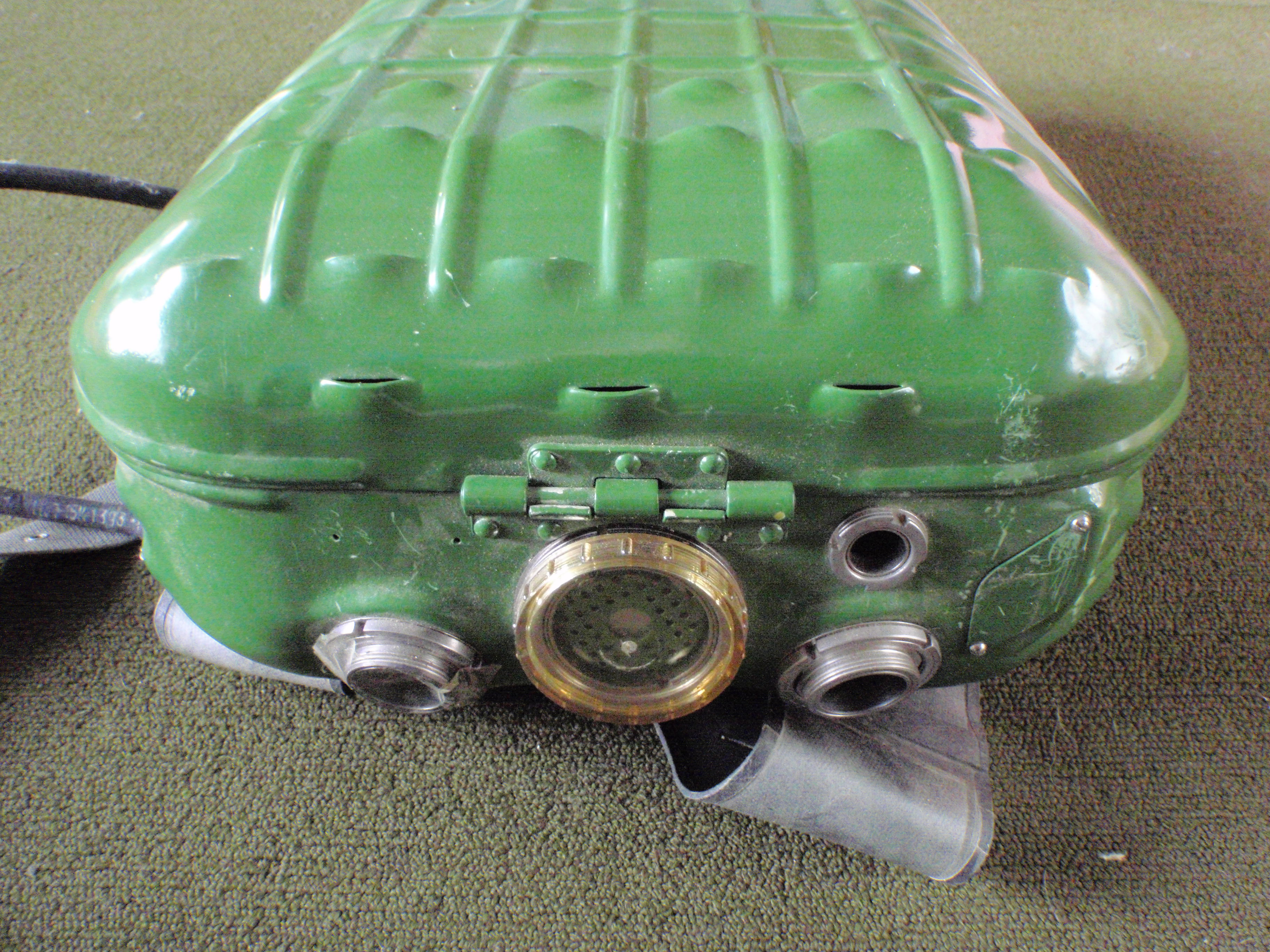
IDA-71 rebreather top/front end showing ADV in the middle

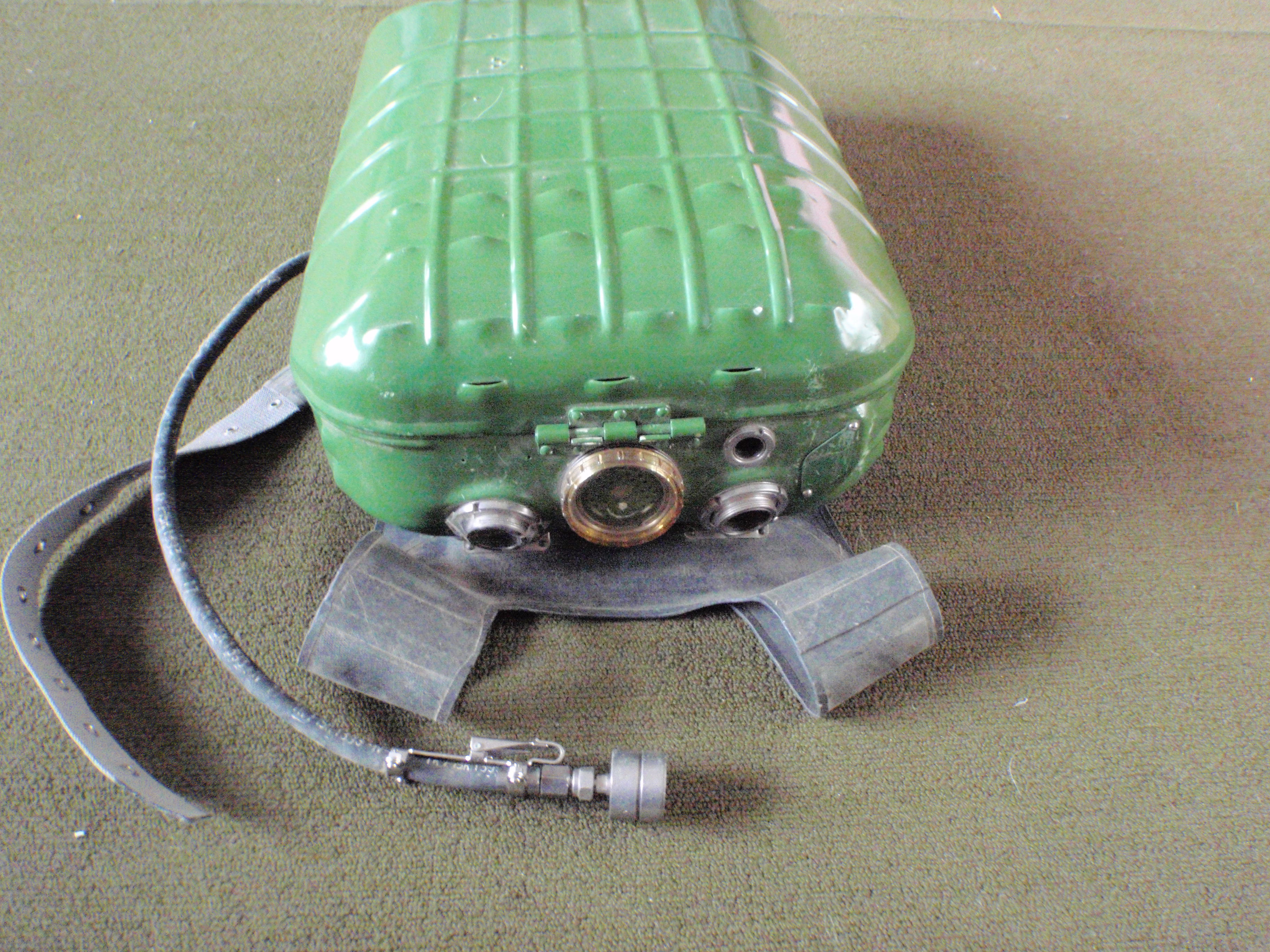
Front end of IDA-71

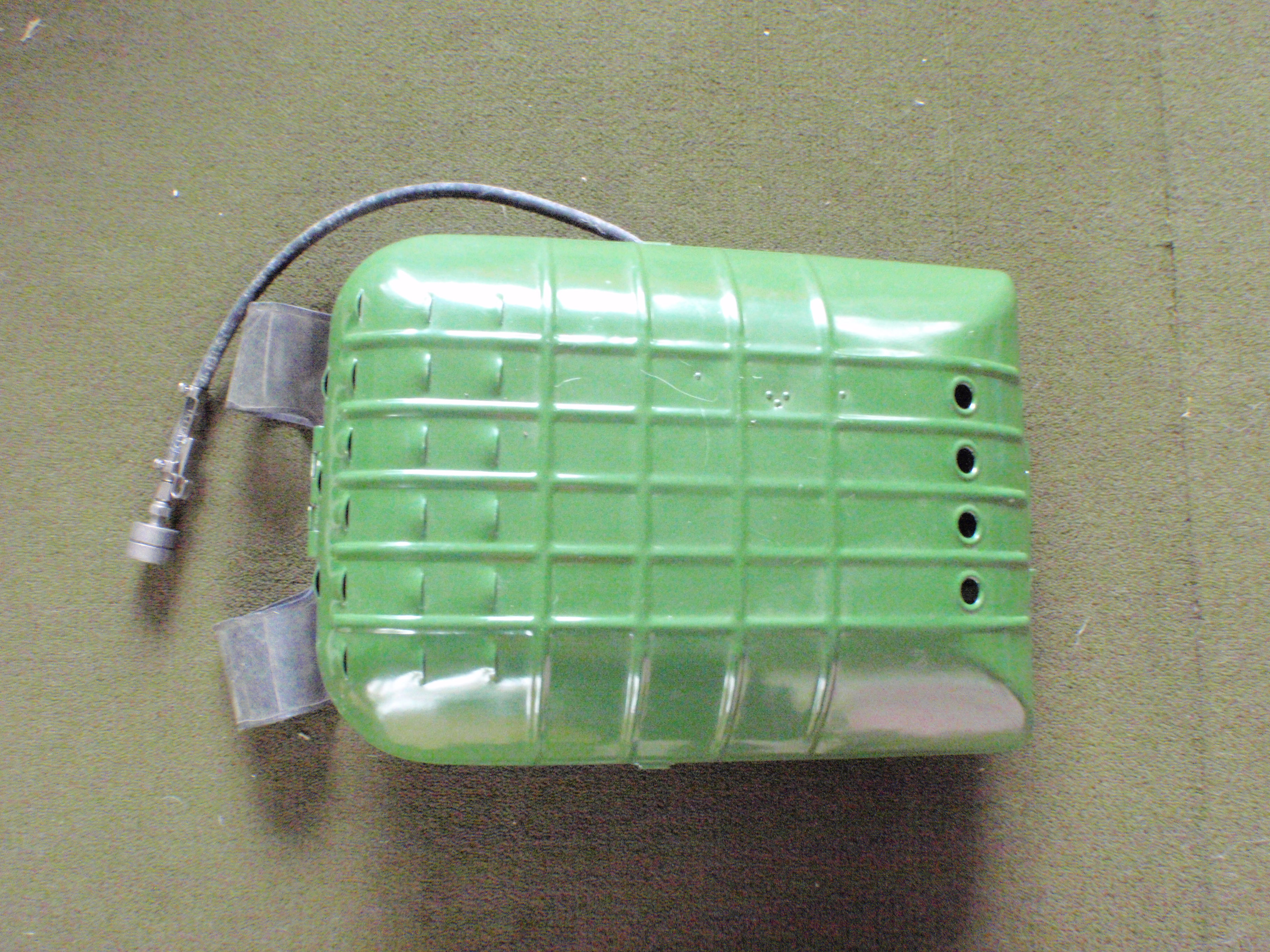
Top/back view of IDA 71 in its casing

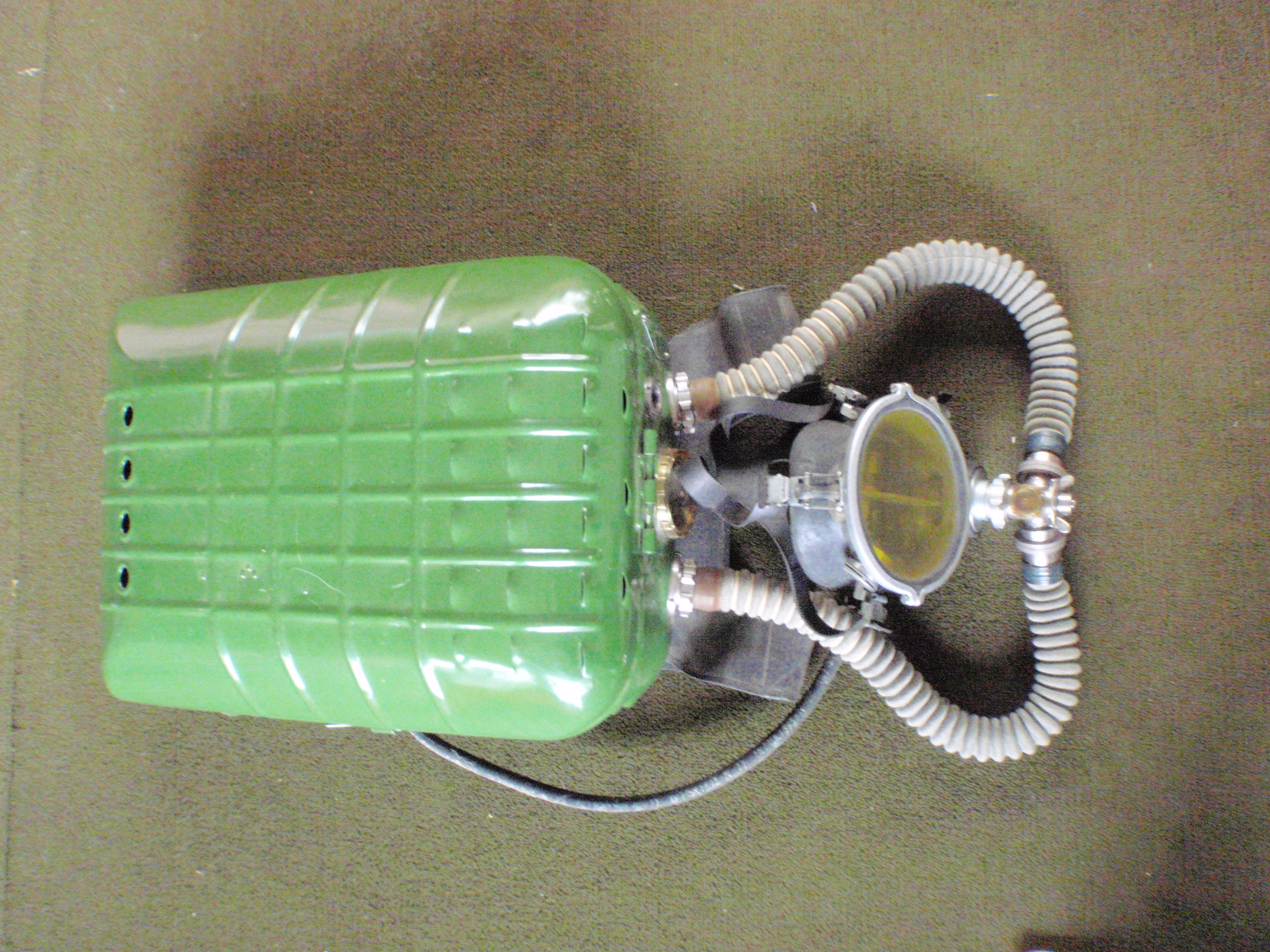
IDA-71 rebreather with breathing hoses and full face mask fitted. top view.

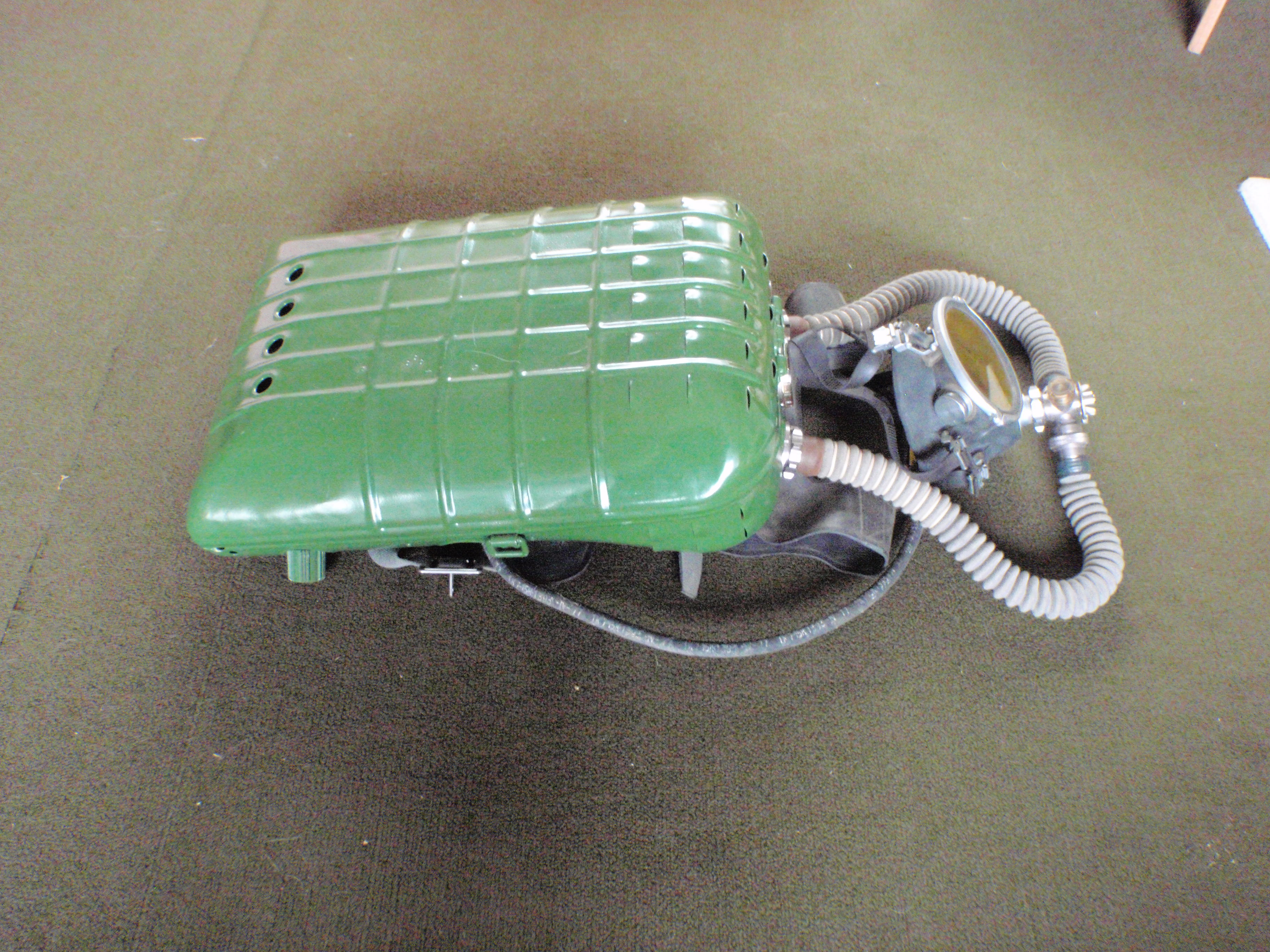
IDA-71 rebreather with breathing hoses and full face mask fitted

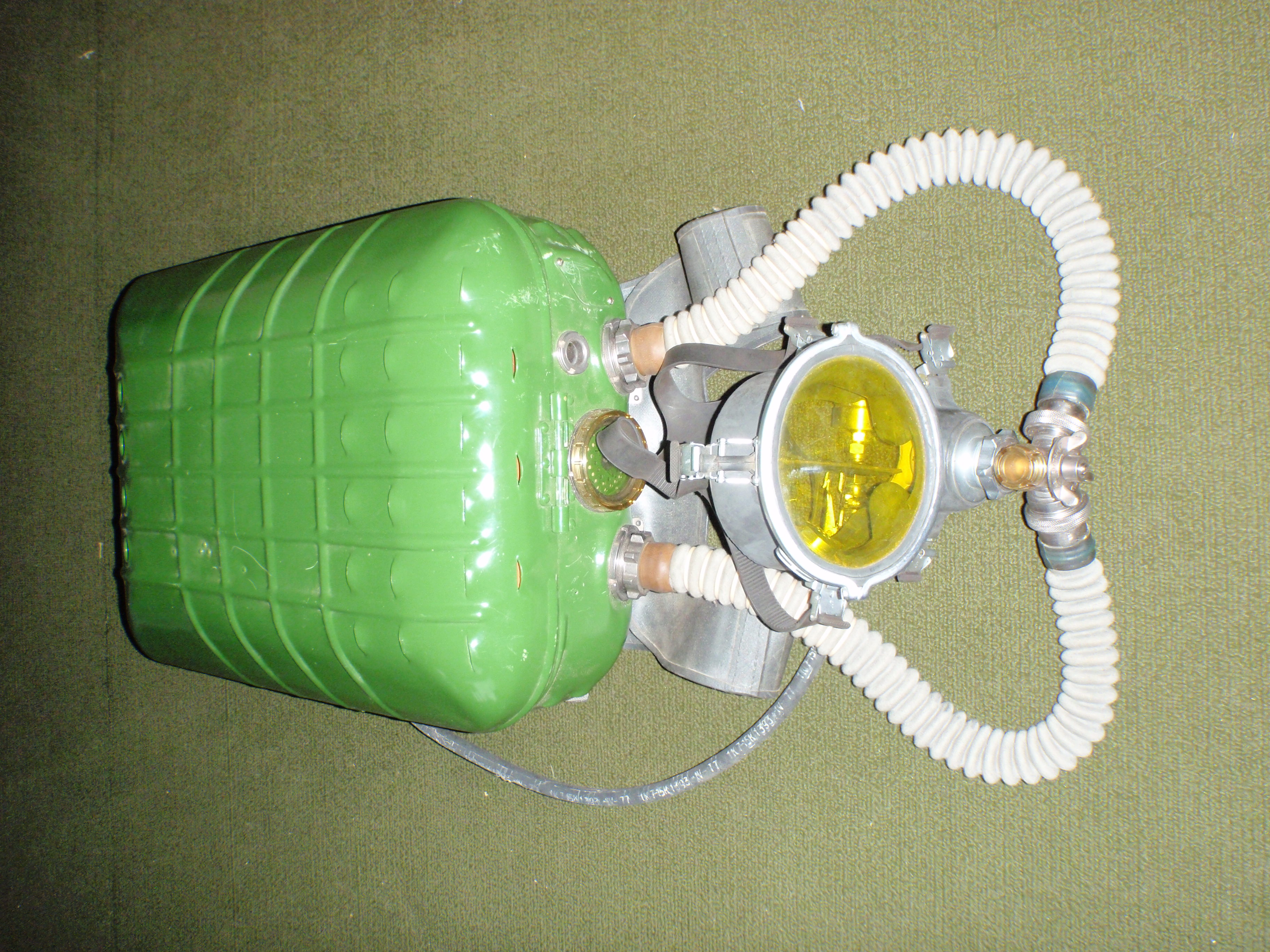
IDA-71 rebreather with breathing hoses and full face mask fitted

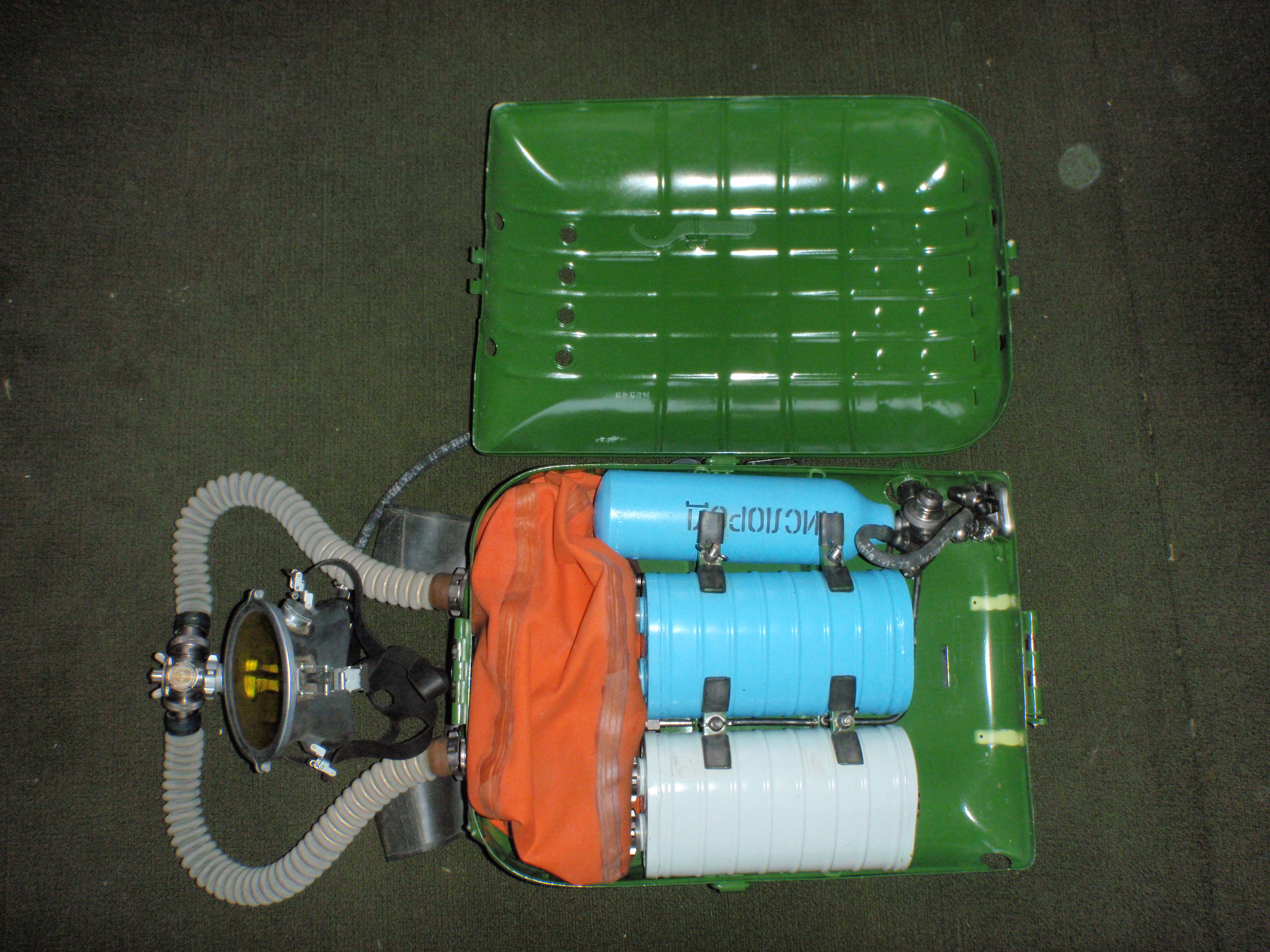
IDA-71 with lid of casing opened showing interior with counterlung, scrubber canisters and oxygen supply cylinder and regulator

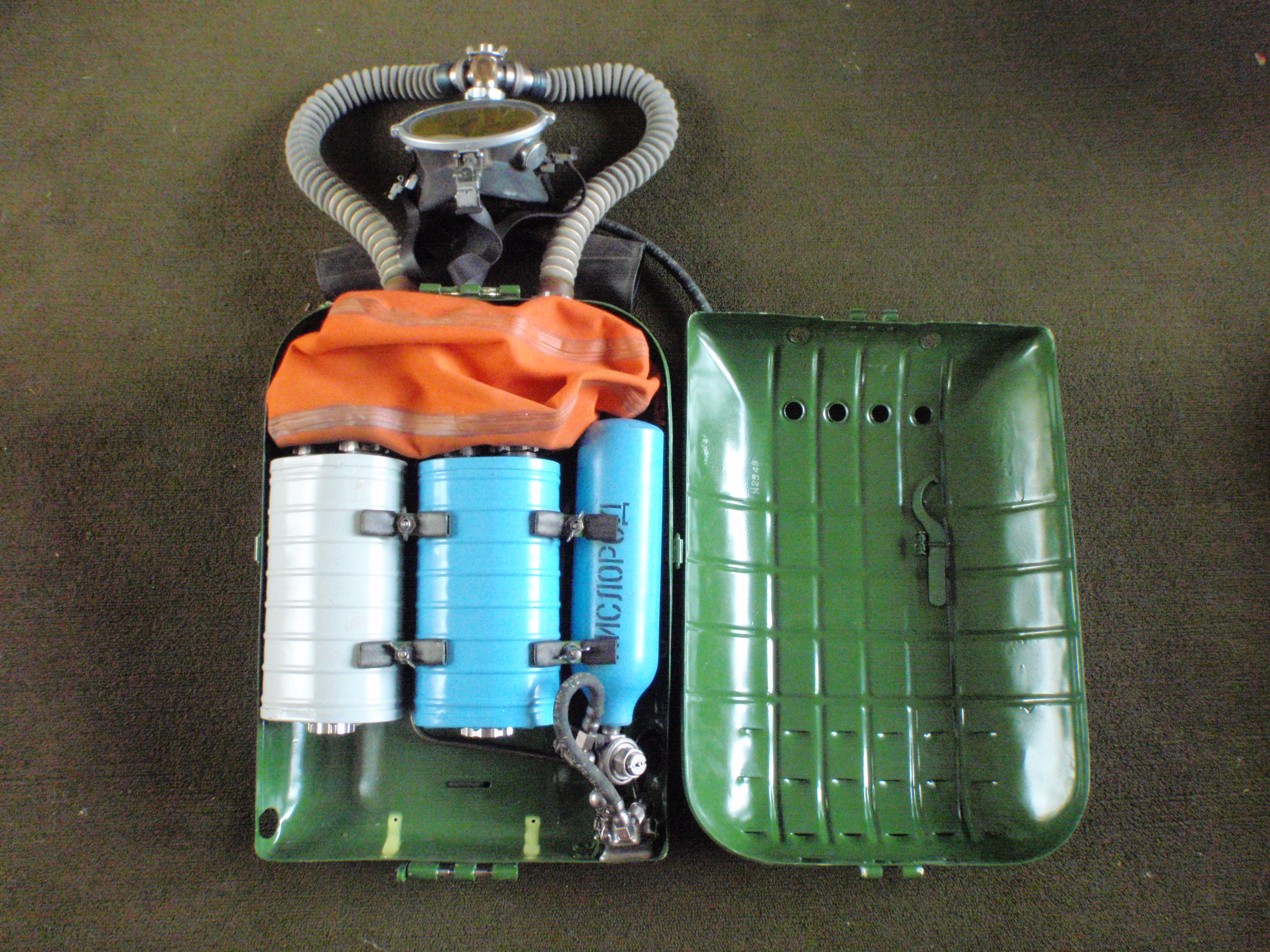
IDA-71 with lid of casing opened showing interior with counterlung, scrubber canisters and oxygen supply cylinder and regulator

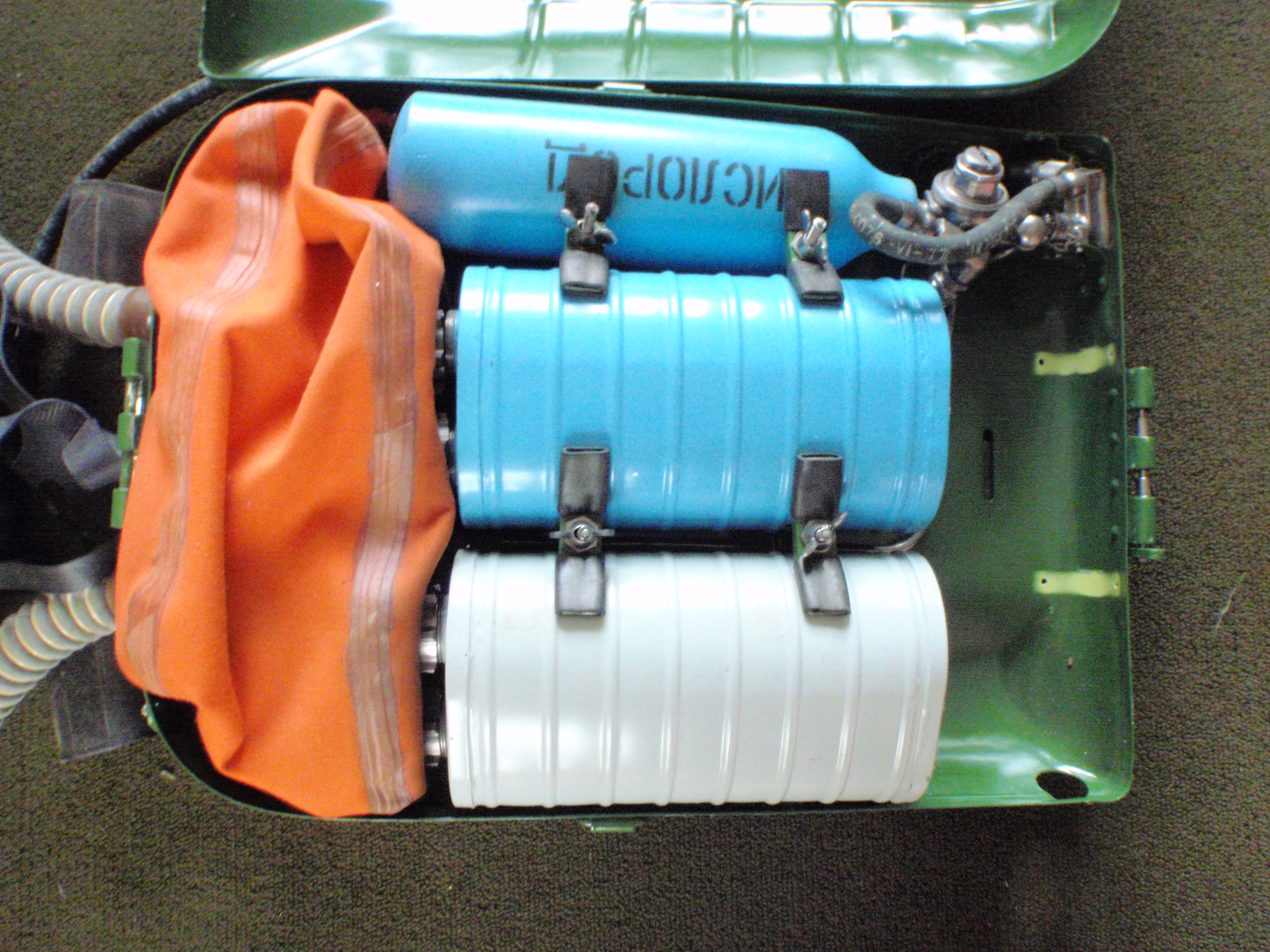
IDA-71 with lid of casing opened showing interior with counterlung, scrubber canisters and oxygen supply cylinder and regulator

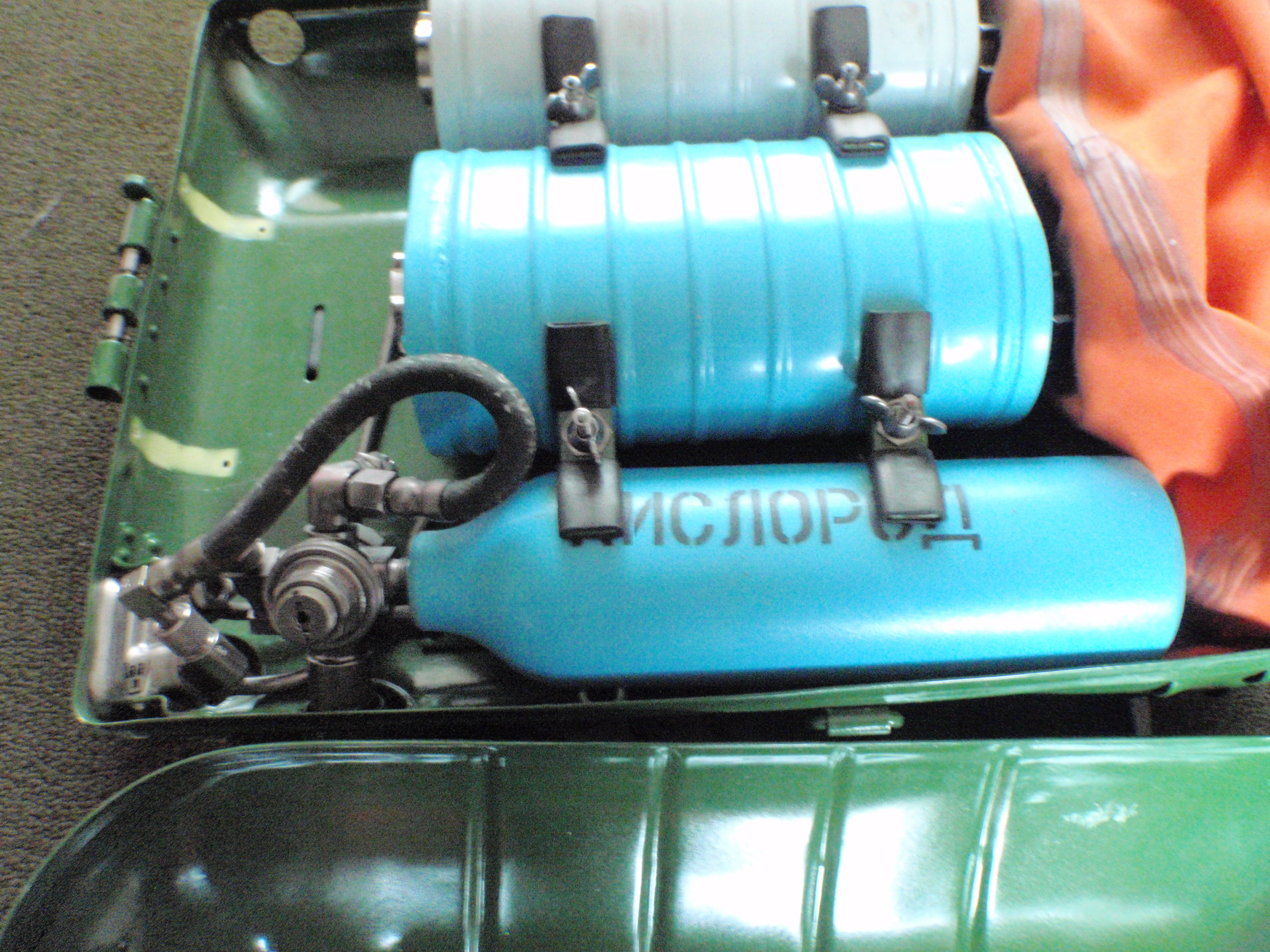
Close up of oxygen supply cylinder and regulator in an IDA-71 rebreather

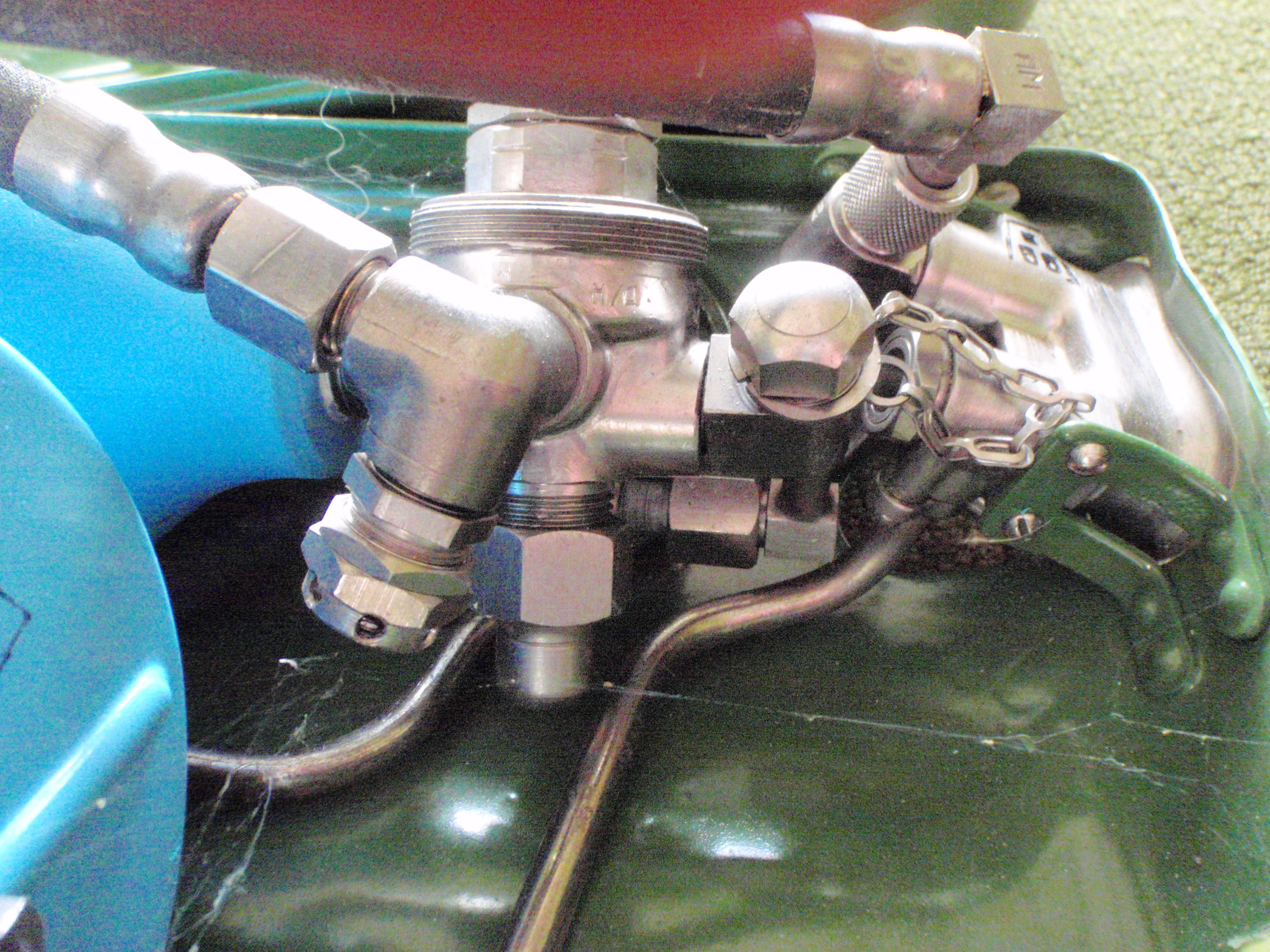
Close up of oxygen supply regulator in an IDA-71 rebreather

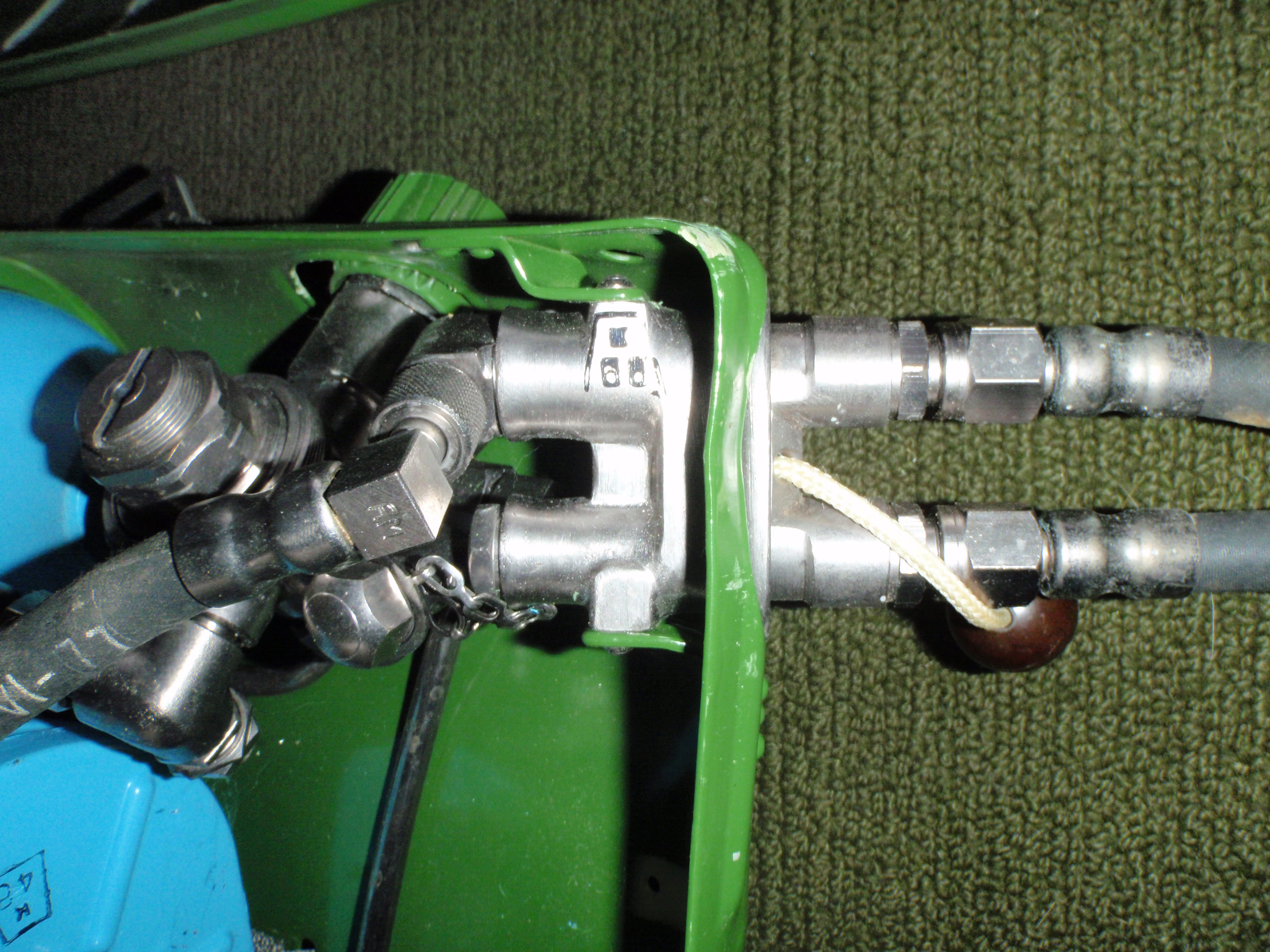
IDA-71 external Nitrox connection point

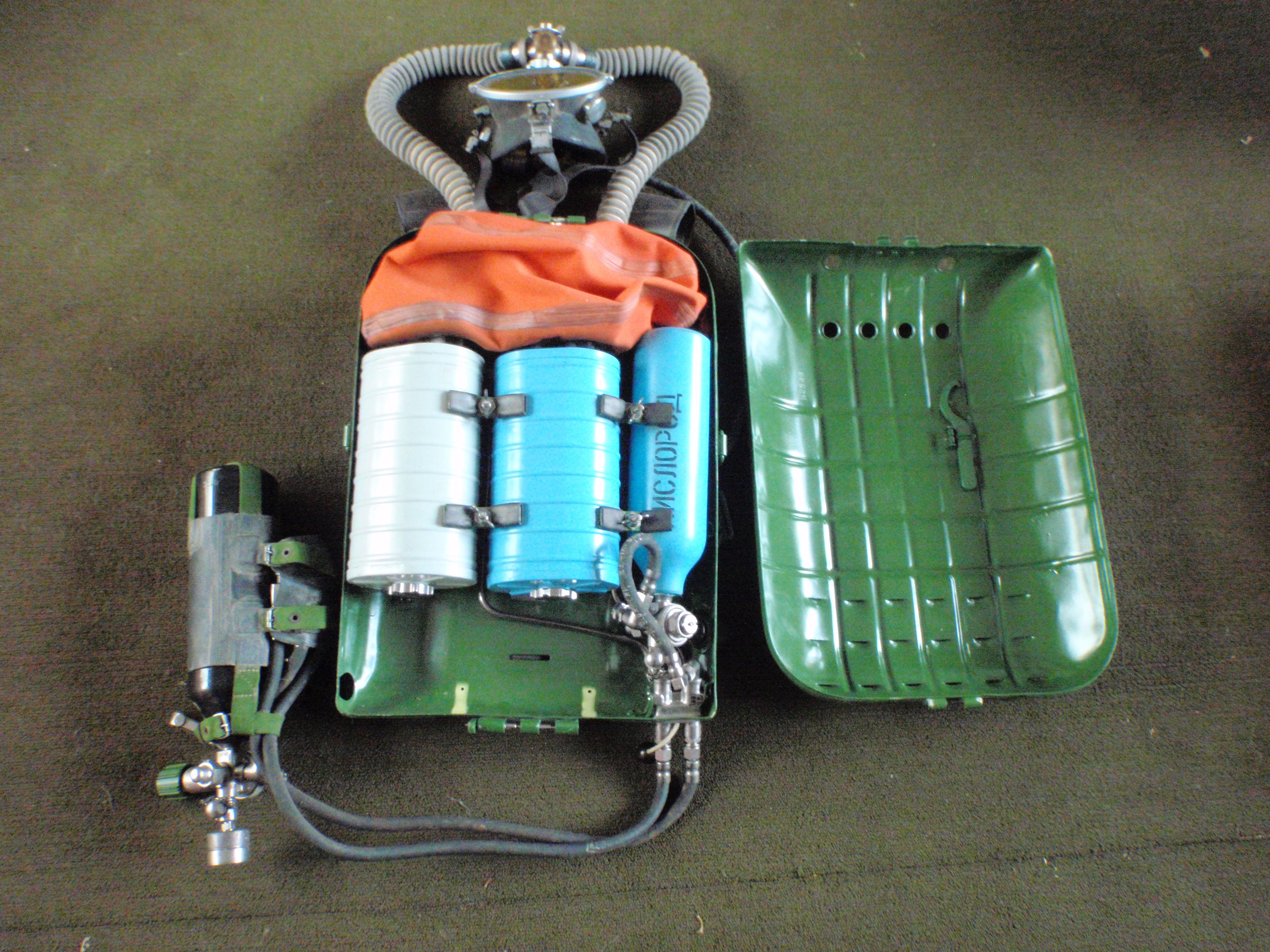
IDA-71 with lid of casing opened showing interior with counterlung, scrubber canisters and oxygen supply cylinder and regulator, and external nitrox supply plugged in

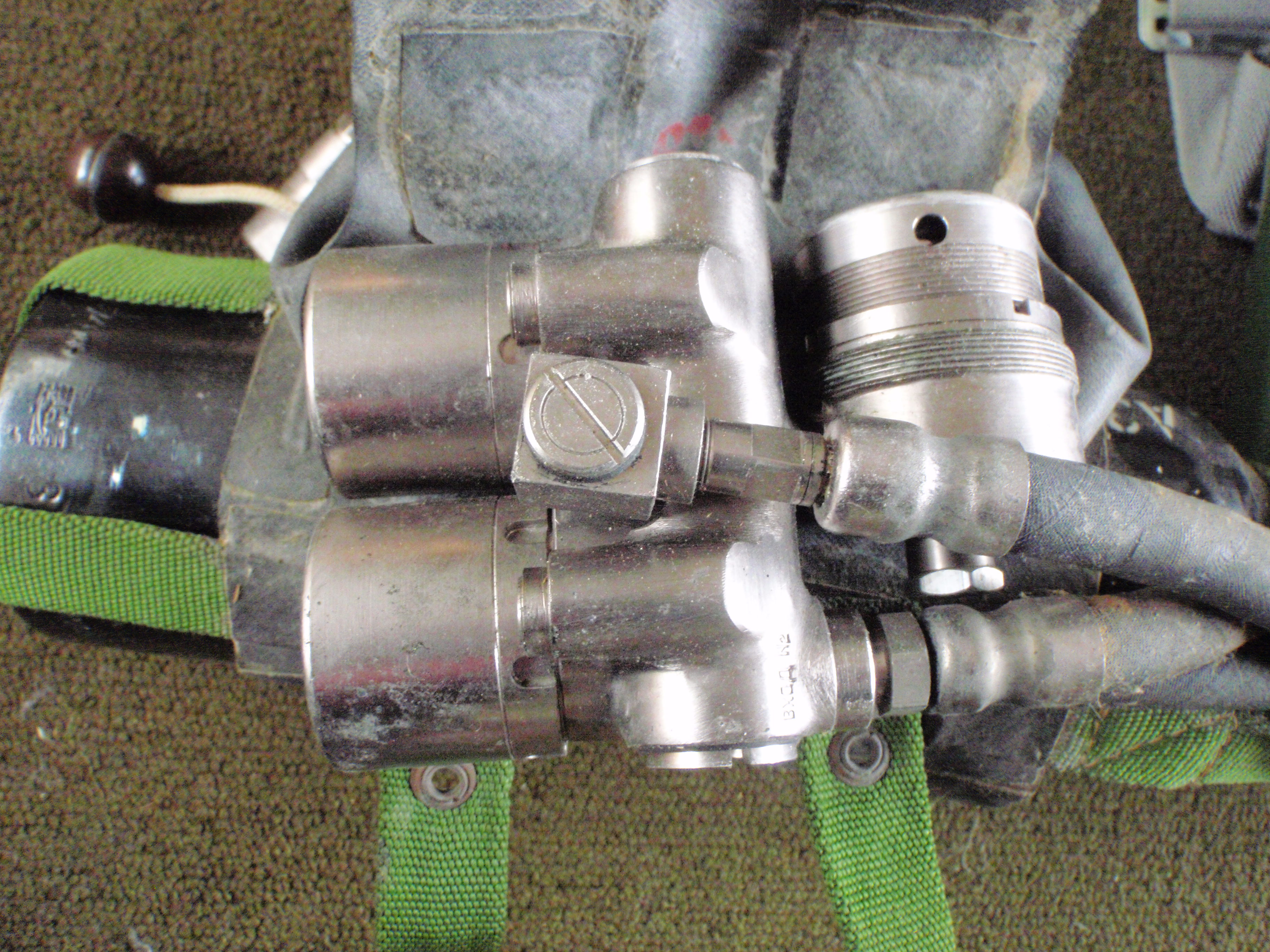
Closeup of the pressure activated nitrox changeover valve mounted on the external nitrox supply cylinder for an IDA-71 rebreather

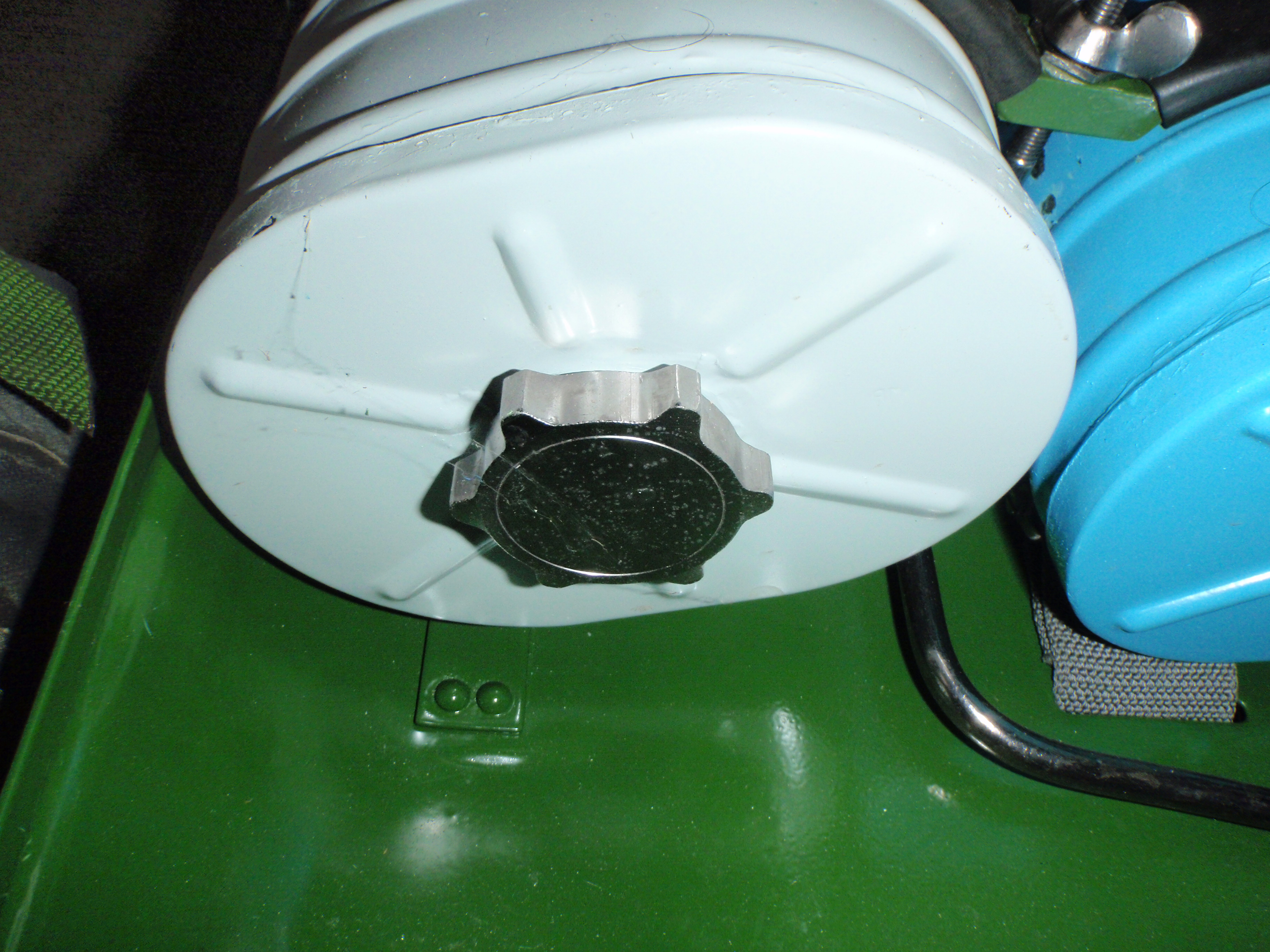
Detail of the scrubber canister of an IDA-71 showing the filling port for absorbent medium

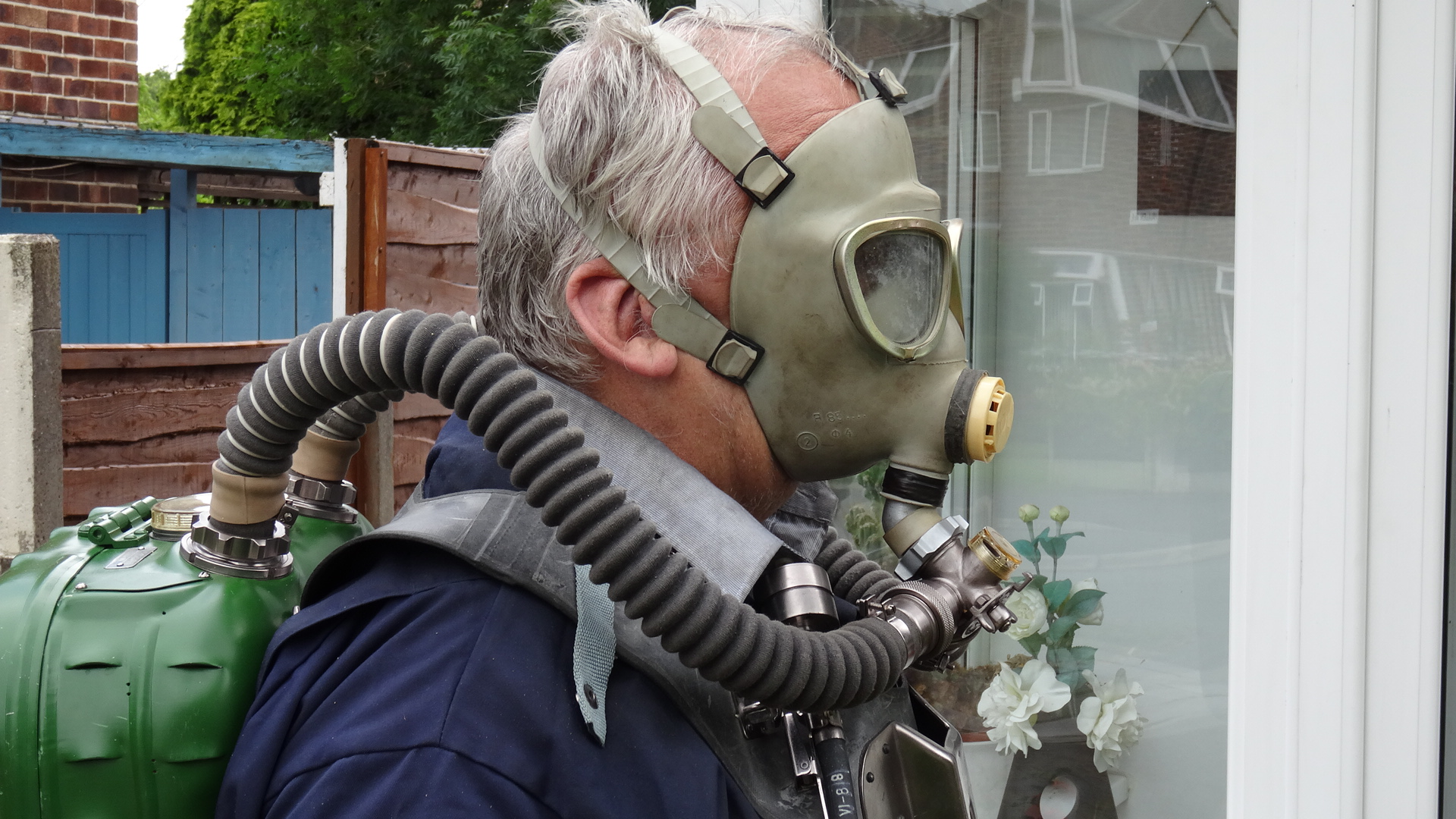
Another type of fullface mask sometimes supplied with an IDA71 rebreather
