= Biological Cosmic Ray Experiment =

Lunar science experiment

The Biological Cosmic Ray Experiment (BIOCORE) was a lunar science experiment that flew on board Command module America as part of Apollo 17. The goal of the BIOCORE experiment was to explore whether or not high-energy cosmic rays produced visibly identifiable trauma to brain and eye tissues.

== Background ==
During the Apollo 11 mission, Buzz Aldrin and Neil Armstrong reported observing flashes of light whenever they had their eyes closed or when the inside of their spacecraft was dimly lit. Every Apollo mission subsequently reported the exact same phenomenon. It was surmised that the cause of these light emissions was the interaction of heavy-ion cosmic rays with the light-detecting cells in the retina of a human eye. This led scientists to question whether or not such heavy cosmic rays might cause damage to the tissues that form the eye, brain and other organs as they transit through a human body.

To assess this, mice with plastic dosimeters surgically implanted under their scalps were flown aboard Apollo 17. The aim for the experiment was to assess whether any microscopic lesions could be visibly identified within the brain, eye and other organ tissues of the mice and whether they could be attributed to high-energy cosmic rays.

== Experiment ==
=== Mice ===
The little pocket mouse (Perognathus longimembris) was selected for the experiment due to a number of its physical and behavioural characteristics. Firstly, the species primarily derives its need for water from its food, produces highly concentrated waste and is a natural hoarder, meaning it could be provided with substantial food. The species was well understood, small in size, easily maintainable when isolated and could withstand environmental stress.

To correlate cosmic rays to any lesions present in tissues, radiation monitors were mounted to the skulls of the pocket mice. These detectors consisted of two layers of cellulose nitrate placed between layers of polycarbonate. These were coated in parylene to make them impermeable and then attached to a molded Silastic silicone rubber mount which would fit the contours of the mouse's skull. Nearly 140 mice had these detectors installed during the experiment's period. Installation of the detectors in the five mice to be flown on board Apollo 17 occurred 35–38 days before launch.

=== Exploratory studies ===
A number of exploratory studies were conducted to establish the preferred characteristics of both the experiment package and the attributes of the mice that would fly on board to facilitate the survival of the mice for the duration of the experiment. The experiments team explored how the mice might react to zero-g, including how they would feed and behave, and how the mice would react to a variety of environmental conditions, including atmospheric composition, pressure and temperature. These experiments led to the death of five mice, but contributed to the decision to use mice weighing 9.5 grams or more due to their proven resistance to stresses.

=== Experiment package ===
Flight packages were developed for the mice that provide life support for the 13 days of the mission. They were closed systems with no requirement for externally provided power or data handling. The experiment's life support consisted entirely of potassium superoxide, which served to both produce oxygen and to absorb carbon dioxide. This approach was proven out through a series of 60 tests using canisters containing KO2 and six mice. Both the reaction rate of the KO2 and the mice themselves would be sensitive to the ambient temperature inside the experiment package. The operating environment of the package was not defined until three months prior to the launch of Apollo 17 and resulted in design changes to the package to account for larger temperature ranges than originally expected. To ensure sufficient oxygen availability at these higher temperatures, the number of mice flown was reduced from six to five. Additional concerns that the increased oxygen pressures inside the experiment's container might itself result in damage to the retinal cells resulted in the addition of pressure release valves that would vent into the spacecraft. Management of the heat generated by both the mice and the KO2 was achieved through conduction from the experiment package directly to the walls of its containing storage locker (A-6) located in the command module of Apollo 17.

The structure of the experiment consisted of 6 aluminium tubes arranged around a central stainless steel tube. The aluminium tubes would contain the mice and their food and the stainless steel tube would contain 0.53 kg of KO2 for life support. The steel tube was covered with a dust screen consisting of Teflon felt and stainless steel screen. These 7 tubes would be contained within a 18 cm wide and 29 cm long air-tight aluminium canister. At one end of the canister was a removable plate containing the package's relief valve, along with a valve that allowed for the flushing of the canisters atmosphere. Thermometers developed for the microbial ecology evaluation device (MEED), first flown on Apollo 16, were used to record the experiment's minimum and maximum temperatures. The package in total weighed 6.1 kg.

=== Pre-flight and flight operations ===
Preparations for the flight package for Apollo 17 began at the Kennedy Space Center on December 2, 1972. Five mice were selected from a colony of 30 who had been prepared at the Ames Research Center and installed into five of the six aluminium tubes. Each tube had a 30 g mixture of seeds that included rye, sunflower seeds, oats and millet. The sixth tube remained empty for the duration of the experiment. Once the canister was sealed with the removable plate, the canister was purged with oxygen for 25 minutes following which the pressure in the canister was reduced to 5.2 psi and a small quantity of helium was added to facilitate leak checks. Once the leak check passed, the pressure in the cylinder was reduced further and maintained at a pressure of 3.3-4.5 psi for the next 36 hours. The package had to be supplied with an external source of oxygen until the concentrations of CO_{2} and H_{2}O in the canister would reach sufficient levels to self sustain their reaction with the KO_{2} to act a sufficient life support system for the duration of the flight. On December 5, 1972, the package was prepared for installation in the A-6 locker in the Apollo 17 command module. To monitor the package's ambient radiation levels, a backup crew person dosimeter was installed on the bottom of the A-6 locker.

== Science ==
Upon return to Earth, it was found that one of the mice had died during flight. The four remaining mice were anesthetized and perfused with a preserving fixing fluid. Following an autopsy, the heads of the mice were placed into aluminum boxes that would facilitate their examination. The heads went through decalcification and dehydration before being cut into 1600 thin sections, each approximately 10 millimicrons thick. Around 80 cosmic-ray particles were found to have interacted with the plastic detectors that had been inserted under the scalps of the mice. The cosmic rays seen all had very similar energies and it is believed that the Apollo 17 vehicle and the experiment package reduced the frequency and energy of the cosmic rays that interacted with the mice. No demonstrable lesions were identified in the mice and the attenuation of the ambient radiation by the experiment package was suspected to have played a part. Few of the high-energy particles reached the mice.
