= Fee, Fi, Fo, Fum, and Phooey =

Mice that orbited the Moon on Apollo 17

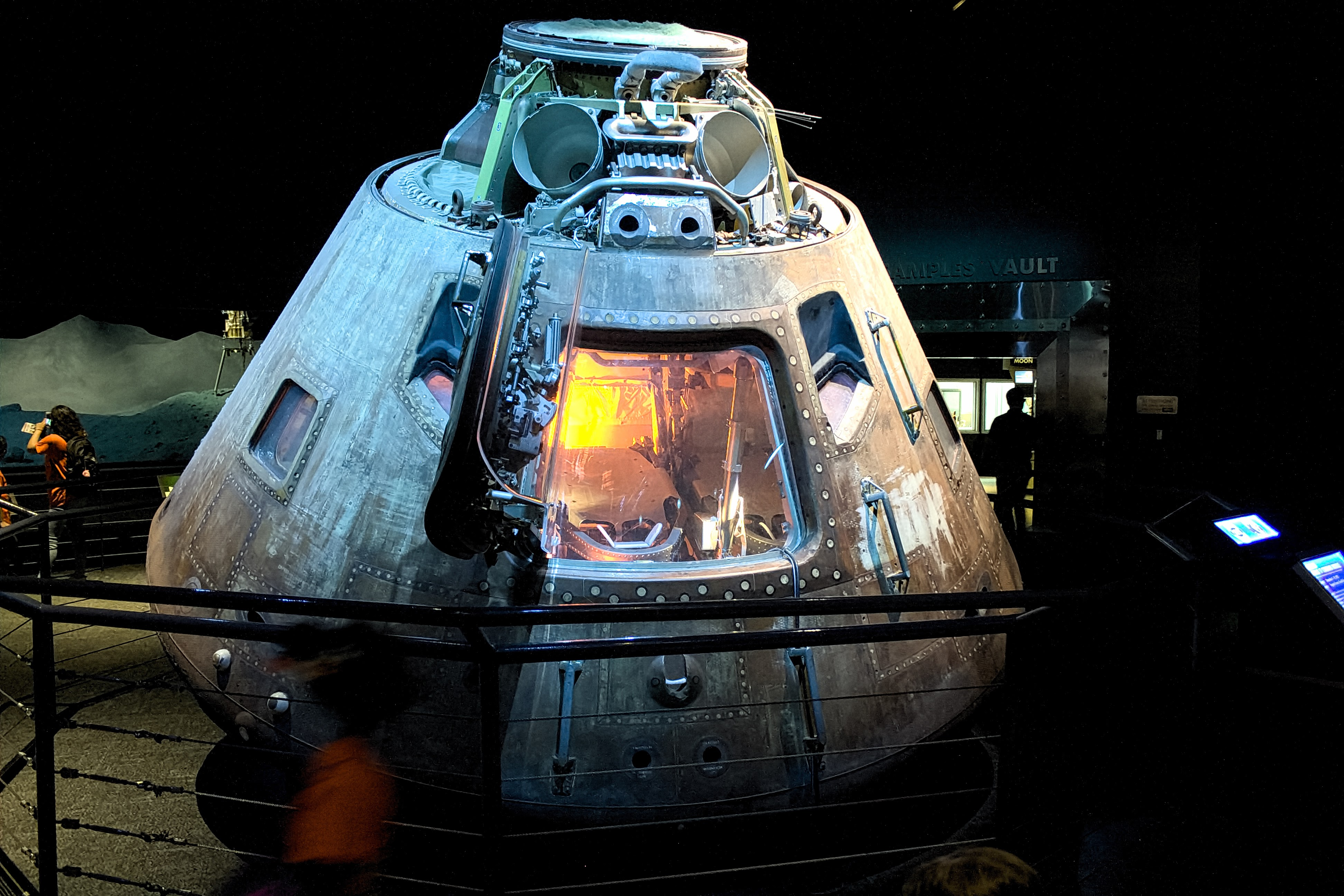
Five mice and three astronauts traveled toward the Moon and returned to Earth in Apollo 17's Command Module America, now on display at Space Center Houston.

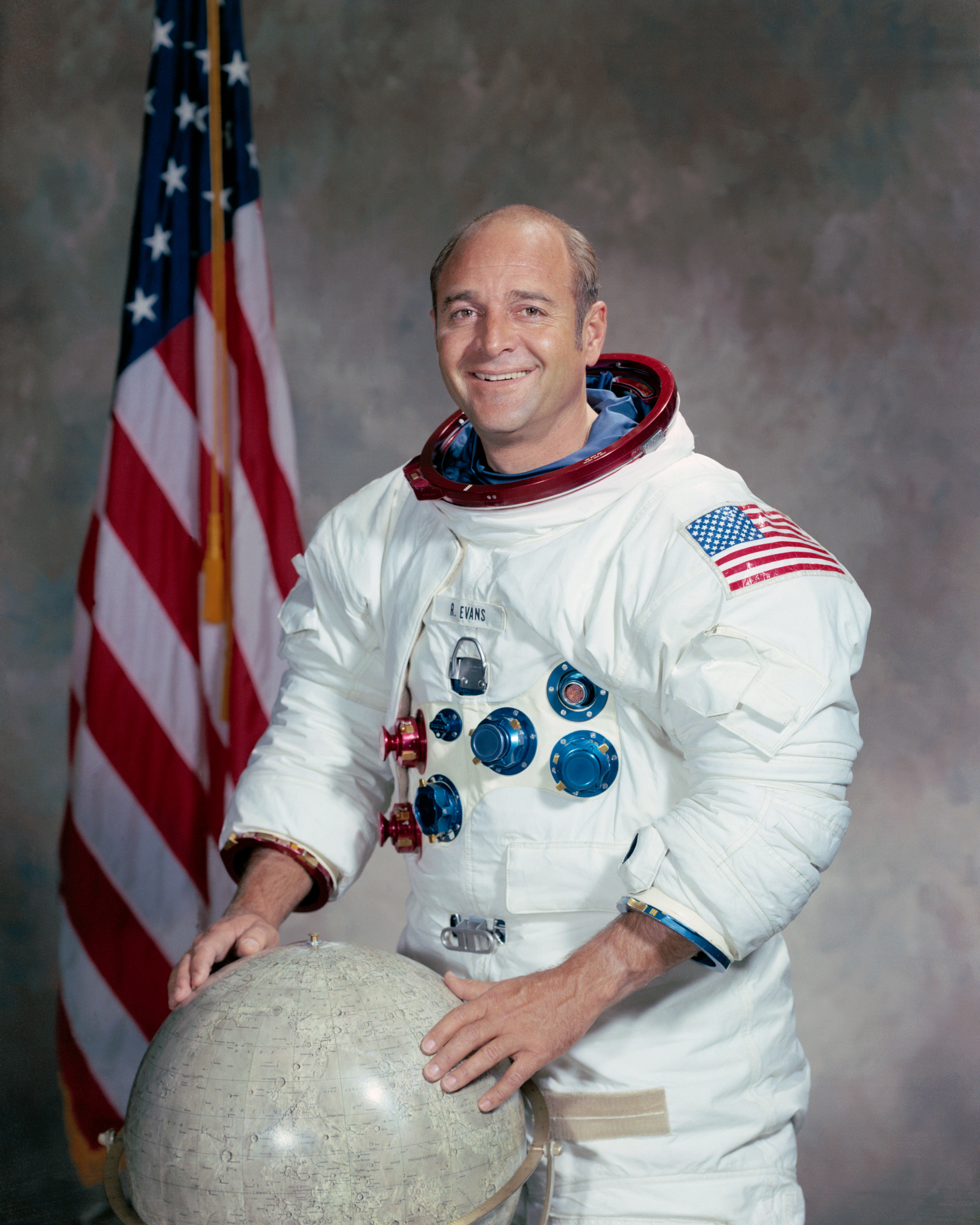
NASA astronaut Ronald Evans and the mice orbited the Moon together for over six days in 1972.

Fee, Fi, Fo, Fum, and Phooey were five mice who orbited the Moon a record 75 times on the 1972 Apollo 17 mission.

The mice were part of the Biological Cosmic Ray Experiment (BIOCORE), a study designed to measure whether cosmic radiation would damage living tissue during spaceflight. NASA gave them identification numbers A3305, A3326, A3352, A3356, and A3400, and their nicknames were given by the Apollo 17 crew (Eugene Cernan, Harrison Schmitt, and Ronald Evans). The four male mice, one female mouse, and Evans orbited the Moon for a record-setting six days and four hours in the Apollo command module America as Cernan and Schmitt performed the Apollo program's last lunar excursions.

One male mouse, A-3352, died during the trip, and the four survivors were euthanized and dissected for their expected biological information upon their return from Moon orbit. After recovery, researchers examined the surviving mice's ears, brains, organs, and other tissues to look for possible changes caused by radiation exposure or other flight conditions.

The mice and the three astronauts were the last living beings to orbit the Moon, and the last to leave low Earth orbit until the Artemis II lunar flyby in 2026. Evans and the mice share two living-being spaceflight records: the longest amount of time spent in lunar orbit (147 hours 43 minutes), and the most lunar orbits completed (75).

== Mission and trip ==
Apollo 17 launched December 7, 1972, and returned to Earth on December 19. The Biological Cosmic Ray Experiment (BIOCORE) carried the five pocket mice (Perognathus longimembris), a species chosen for the experiment due to being capable of producing water metabolically, resilient to expected mission temperatures and partial pressures, and capable of surviving expected relative humidity among other aspects. Additional supplemental advantages included the species small size, self-sufficiency in an isolated state, and producing highly concentrated waste.

The mice traveled in individual cylindrical tubes just large enough to turn around inside an aluminum container. Each tube contained enough food to last the length of the mission. Potassium superoxide kept the mice alive during the flight by reacting with the carbon dioxide and producing fresh oxygen. So, the canister did not need anything from the spacecraft or its crew to keep working. Four more mice stayed behind on the ground as a comparison group, first at Kennedy Space Center and later at Ames Research Center. They went through control testing against the mice that flew.

Fee, Fi, Fo, Fum, and Phooey
- Species: Little pocket mouse
- Sex: 4 male, 1 female
- Known for: Orbiting the Moon

Fee, Fi, Fo, Fum, and Phooey were acquired from the California desert and had been implanted with radiation dosimeters under their scalps to see whether they would suffer damage from cosmic rays. There were no damaging effects from these plates observed even after several months of insertion. Four of the five mice survived the flight and the cause of death of the fifth was not determined.

On return trip to Earth, the canister containing the mice was filled with a mix of oxygen and helium before being brought to a recovery lab in Pago Pago, American Samoa about seven hours after splashdown.

== Procedures and findings ==
The four remaining live mice were euthanized and dissected first at the Lyndon B. Johnson Tropical Medical Center and later brought to Duke University for storage and future testing. During the initial opening of the cannisters, one mouse died, while two were extremely active, and the remaining two were highly subdued, only moving when prodded. The one female pocket mouse which had been the most subdued was found to have had a brain hemorrhage within the middle ear canal, likely causing this behavior. Although lesions in the scalp and liver were detected, they appeared to be unrelated to one another and were not thought to be the result of cosmic rays. Lesions within the olfactory epithelium were also increased within all flight mice, but inconclusive in tying to cosmic particle radiation as the cause. No damage was found in the mice's retinas or viscera.

At the time of the publication of the Apollo 17 Preliminary Science Report the mice's brains had not yet been examined, but subsequent studies showed no significant effect on their brains. The dosimeters of each mouse found a total of eighty heavy particles, though only five were proven to have entered the dosimeter before the head, while forty-one passed through the head first. This impacted results of each scan by changing the energy loss seen in particles per millimicron travelled via linear energy transfer. Further study of the brains found the Z component of free space cosmic ray flux was in the medium range for 2 particles and heavy range for 3. All of these stopped within the brains of the pocket mice.

== Legacy ==
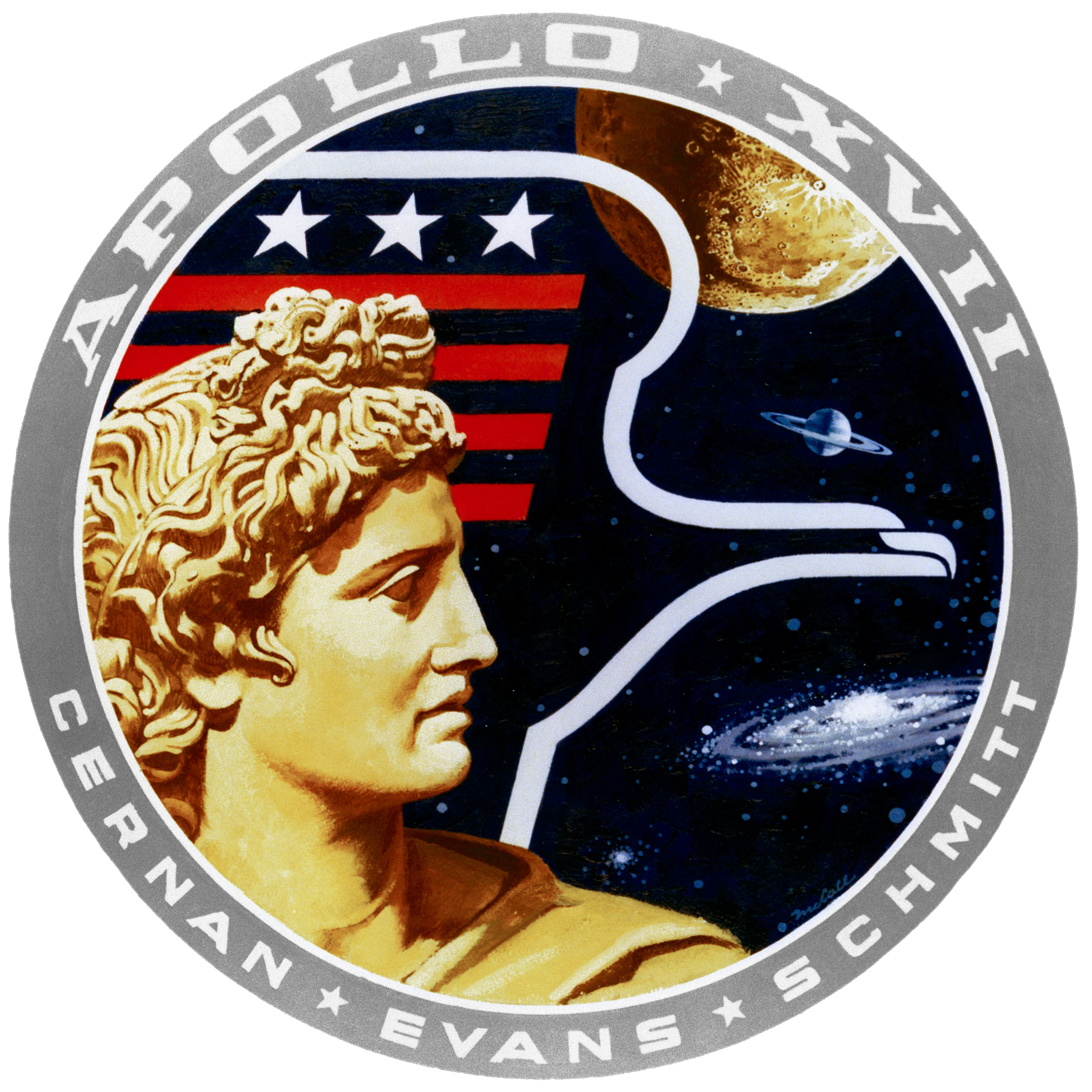
Apollo 17 mission insignia

The pocket mouse species used in the BIOCORE experiment remains part of active scientific research today. In 2024, researchers published a new reference genome for Perognathus longimembris longimembris, built using modern long read DNA sequencing methods. Their introduction describes the Apollo 17 mission and the mice's role in it. They recognize Fee, Fi, Fo, Fum, and Phooey by name for their part in early research on the species. The genome assembly is meant to help future studies into how the species adapts to dry desert conditions, including its ability to go without water for long periods, the same traits that made these mice useful for spaceflight research.

== Gallery ==
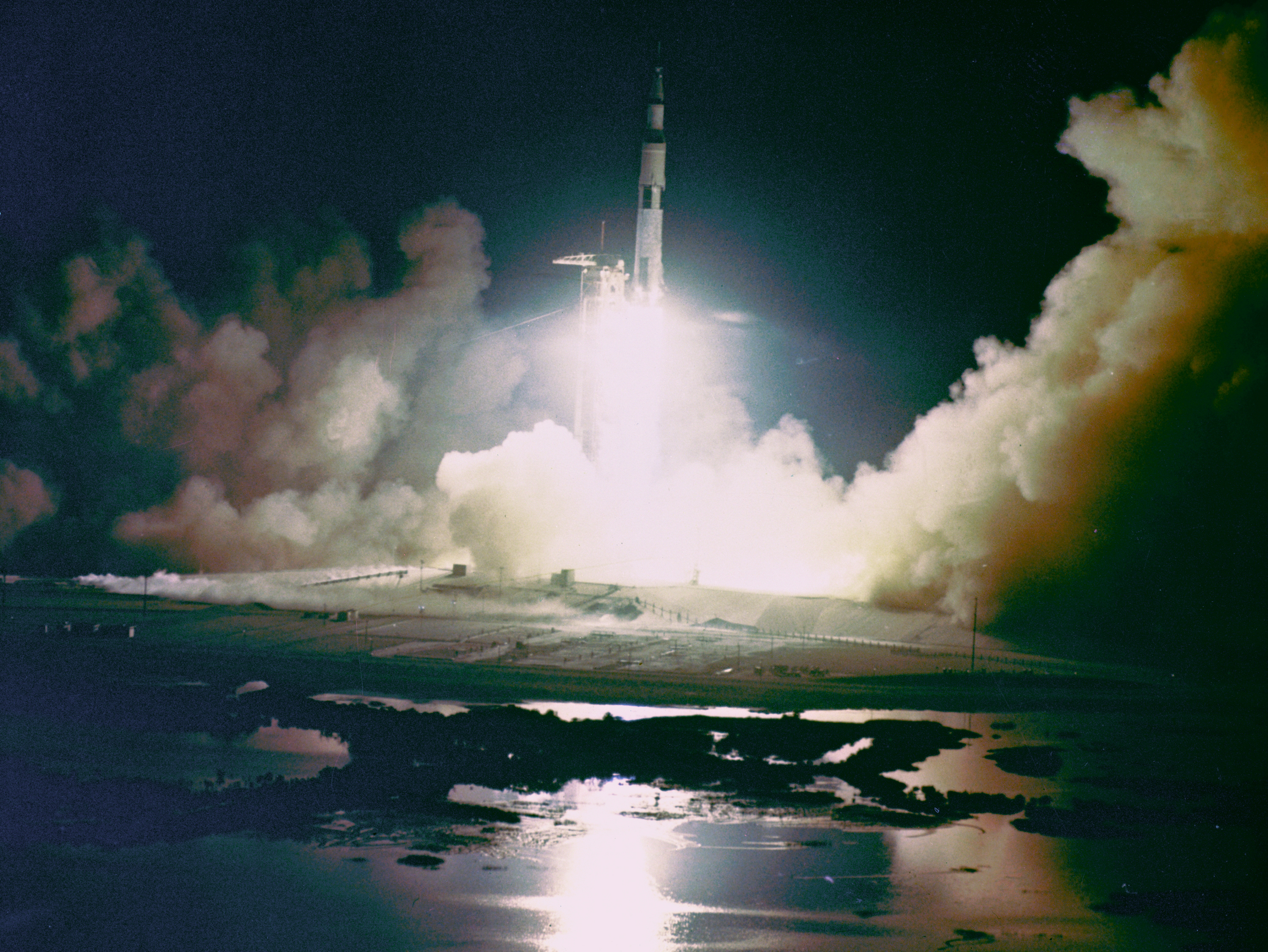
The night launch of Apollo 17, December 7, 1972

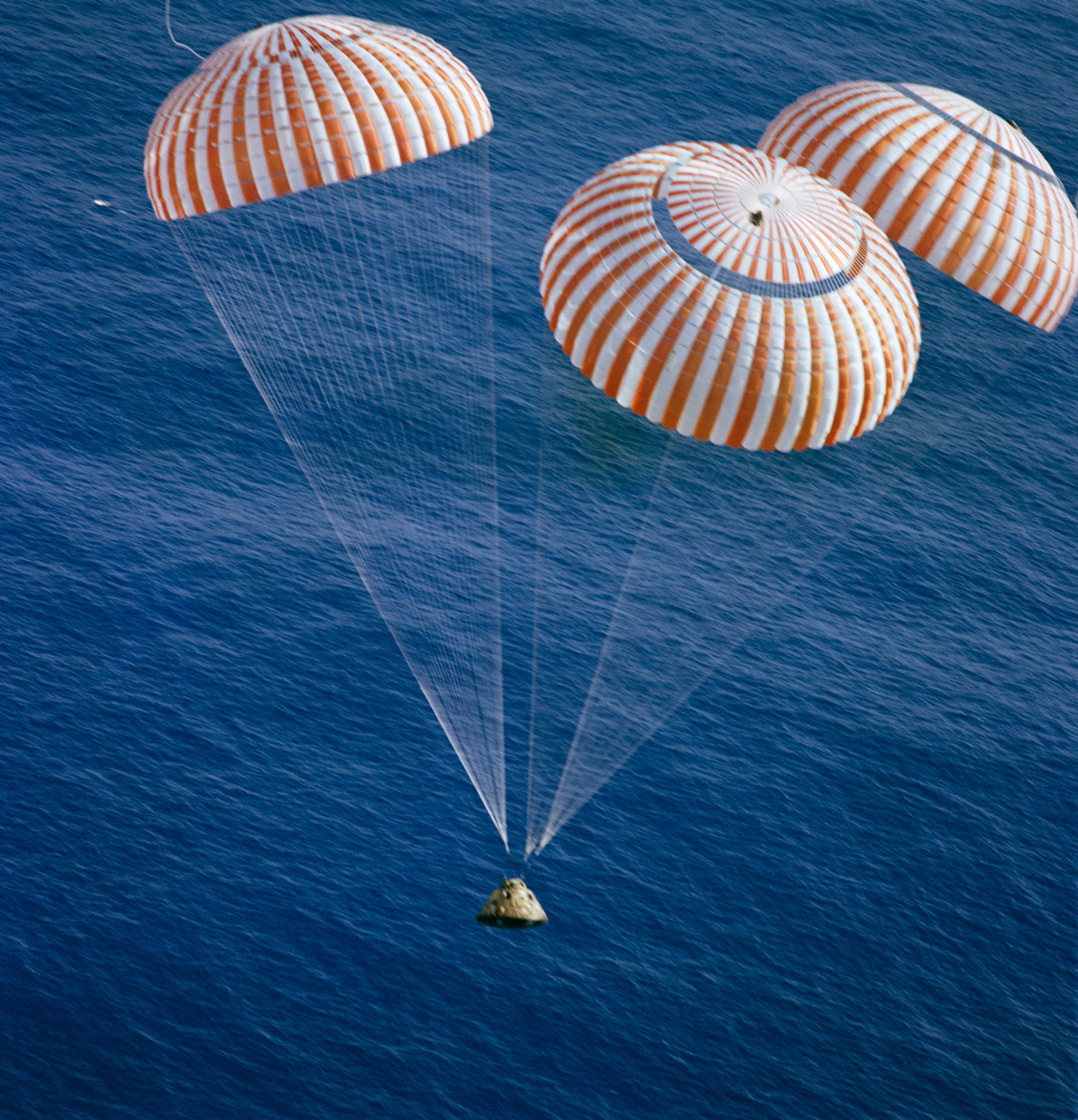
The Apollo 17 space capsule about to splash down in the south Pacific Ocean

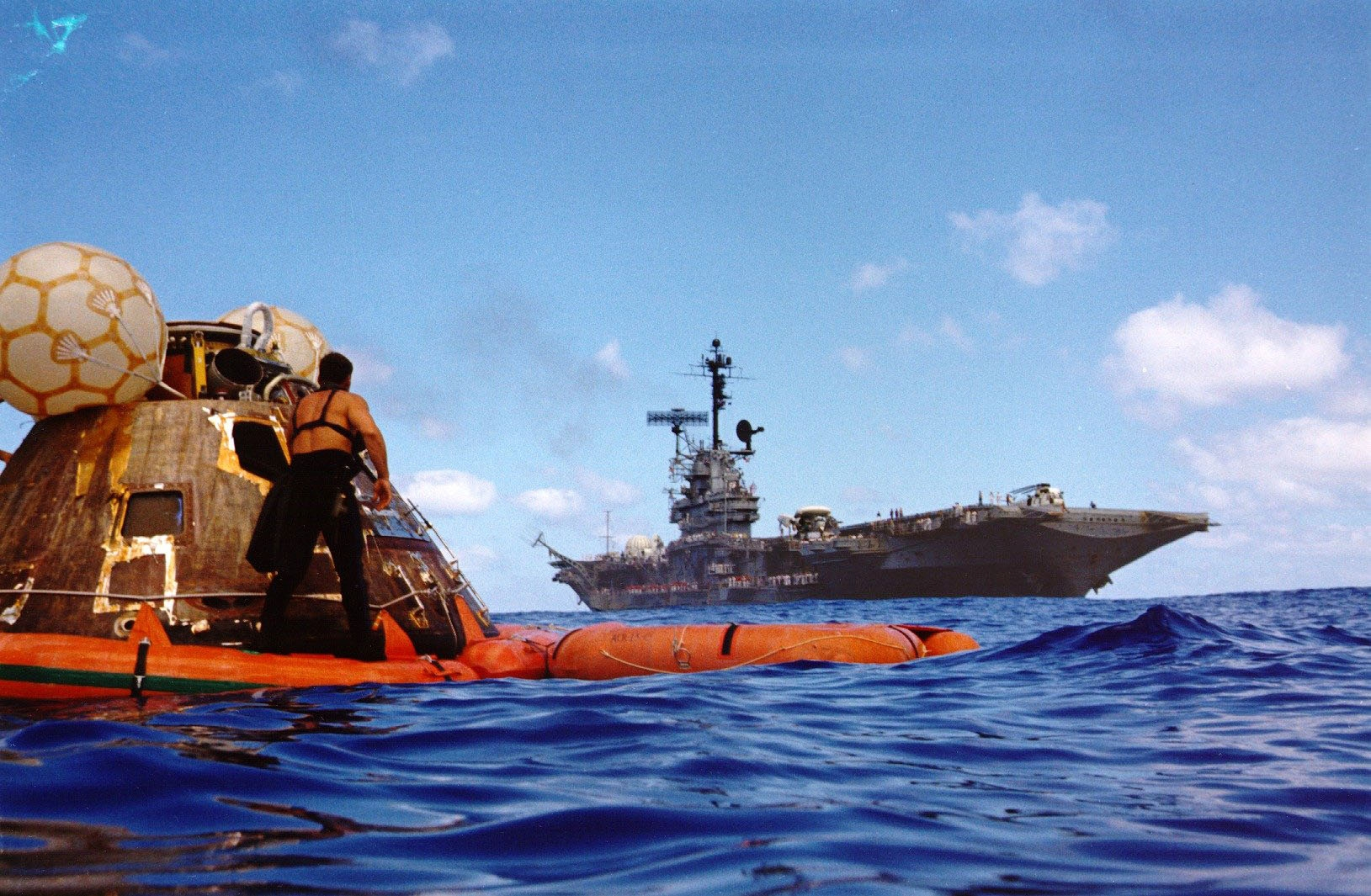
The mice and Command Module America being retrieved by the USS Ticonderoga on December 19, 1972. The three astronauts were already aboard the ship.

== See also ==
- Animals in space
- Fee-fi-fo-fum, the namesake portion of the 1734 English fairy tale "Jack and the Beanstalk"
- Zond 5, a Soviet space program circumlunar voyage in September 1968, by two tortoises and assorted small plants and insects. They were the first Earthlings to fly to the vicinity of the Moon.
- Zond 6, turtles on a circumlunar mission in November 1968
- Zond 7, four turtles flew the August 1969 circumlunar flight
