= Mendeleev readings =

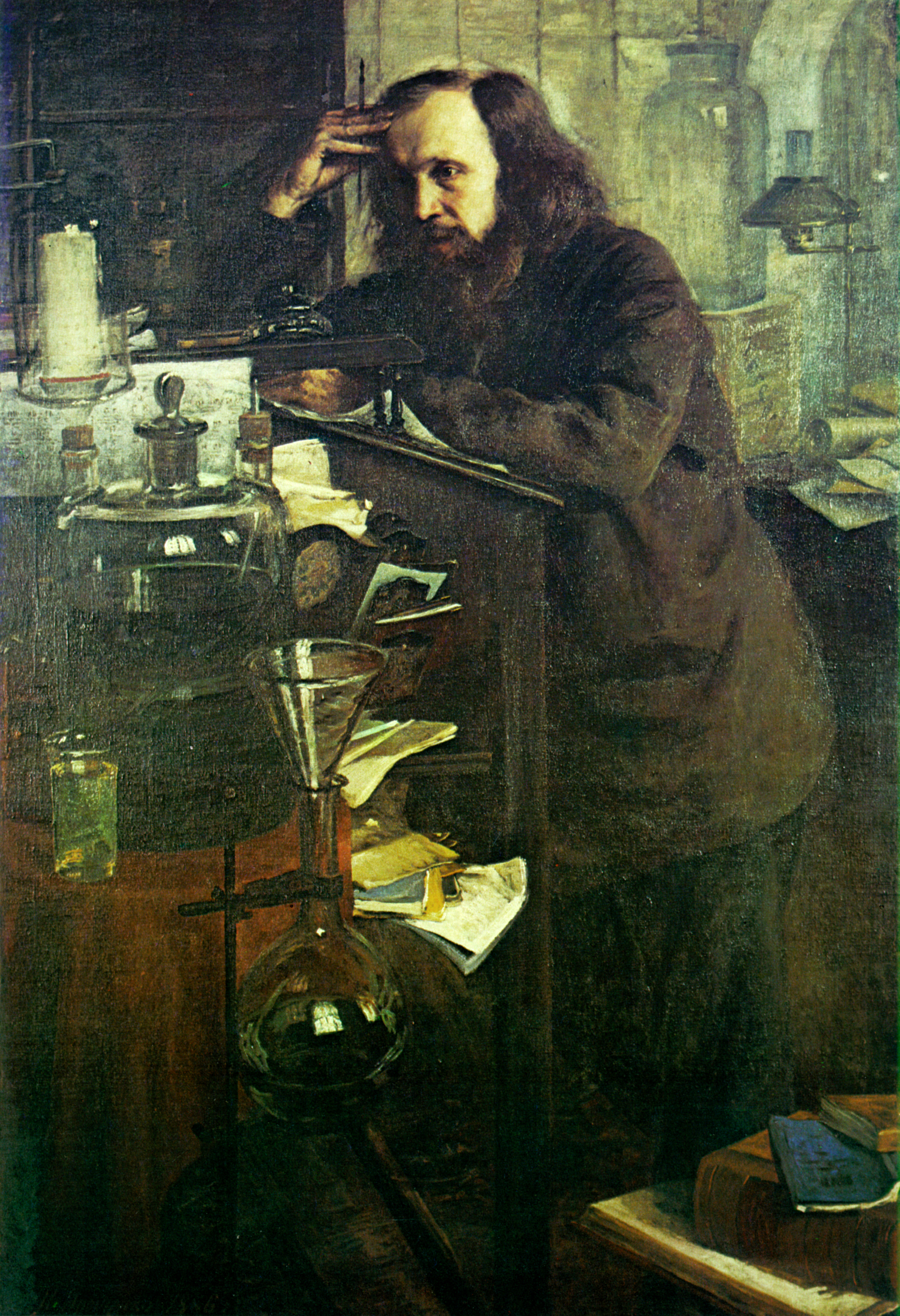
Dmitri Mendeleev

Mendeleev readings — a solemn act, the annual reports of leading Soviet/Russian scholars on topics affecting all areas of chemistry and its related sciences: physics, biology and biochemistry. Date of readings is due to two dates: birthday of Dmitri Mendeleev (8 February 1834), and sending messages to them on the opening Periodic Law (March 1869).

- Established by decision of the Board Russian Physical-Chemical Society (founded: Chemical part – 1 January 1868; Physical – May 1872: merged in 1876) and the Academic Board Leningrad State University — 20 January 1940.
- Held annually since 1941.
- The tradition was interrupted by the Great Patriotic War.
- Annual commemoration Mendeleev readings resumed in 1947 in the Leningrad branch of WMOs with LSU—in the 40th anniversary of the death of Mendeleev.
- In 1953, because of mourning for Stalin, reading is not performed.
- In 1968 for Jubilee of the opening of Periodic Law—three readings: one—in March, and two—in October.

The right to participate in the readings is determined only criterion—only an outstanding contribution to science reader, is also an indispensable academic degree — Doctor, so the choice of narrator titles, awards and administrative positions have traditionally not been considered and are not indicated.

Mendeleev reading had read the presidents and vice presidents of the USSR Academy of Sciences (after 1991 — Russian Academy of Sciences (RAS)), Active and corresponding members of the Academy. Minister, Nobel laureates, professors.

Mendeleev readings is always performed at the Leningrad State University, now—in the Saint Petersburg State University, a large chemical audience Department of Chemistry St. Petersburg State University (in the yard the main university building—on the Vasilevsky Island of St. Petersburg); currently reading held at the lecture Mendelian Center—University Embankment, 7 / 9, Vasilevsky Island, St. Petersburg,

== Mendeleev readers ==
- I. — Vitaly Khlopin — 17 March 1941 — "The transformation of elements and the periodic law"
- II. — Alexander Terenin — 21 February 1947 — "The splitting of the molecules under the influence of light"
- III. — Alexander Poraj-Kosice — 28 February 1948 — "On the theory of dyeing"
- IV. — Ivan Zhukov — 17 February 1949. — "The electrical properties of disperse systems"
- V. — Alexander Nesmeyanov — 13 April 1950 — "Conjugation of simple connections"
- VI. — Aleksandr Arbuzov — 22 February 1951 — "Organic derivatives of phosphorus acids"
- VII. — Mikhail Dubinin — 7 February 1952 — "The adsorption of gases and vapours and the structure of adsorbents"
- VIII. — Sergey Shchukarev — 11 February 1954 — "Mendeleev's Theory about the forms of chemical compounds in the light of modern science"
- IX. — Aleksandr Vinogradov — 24 February 1955 — "Isotopes of lead"
- X. — Joseph Evseyevich Stark — 9 February 1956 — "Status of trace elements in liquid and solid phases"
- XI. — Ilya Chernyaev — 7 February 1957. — "Individual chemical elements and complexing"
- XII. — Nikolai Semenov — 27 February 1958 — "On some chain reactions"
- XIII. — Stepan Danilov — 12 February 1959 — "The Origin of simultaneous oxidation-reduction of organic substances"
- XIV. — Boris Nikolsky — 11 February 1960 — "The value of the theory of ion exchange for the development of the theory of solutions"
- XV. — Alexander Grinberg — 9 February 1961 — "Studies on the chemistry of complex compounds"
- XVI. — Valentin Kargin — 15 February 1962 — "The emergence of structures in polymers"
- XVII. — Grigory Razuvaev — 14 February 1963 — "Homological decomposition reaction of organometallic compounds"
- XVIII. — Victor Kondratiev — 13 February 1964 — "A new stage in the development of the kinetics of gas reactions"
- XIX. — Alexander Brodsky — 11 February 1965 — "Study of the mechanism of reactions involving peroxides"
- XX. — Alexander Frumkin — 5 May 1966 — "On potentials, which perceived electrodes in solutions of foreign ions"
- XXI. — Konstantin Mishchenko — 16 February 1967 — "Mendeleyev's Conception of solutions—the basis of modern theory"
- XXII. — Semyon Volfkovich — 4 March 1968 — "Ways of use of agricultural chemicals"
- XXIII. — Vladimir Shpak — 16 October 1968 — "The Role of Ideas Mendeleev and RFHO-WMOs them. Mendeleev in the development of domestic industry "
- XXIV. — Georgy Flyorov — 16 October 1968 — "New elements of the periodic table, prospects and problems of chemical search of superheavy elements"
- XXV. — Vladimir Fock — 20 April 1969 — "Can fit the chemical properties of atoms in a purely spatial representations?"
- XXVI. — Anatoly Petrov — 19 February 1970 — "General regularities in the reactions of conjugated systems"
- XXVII. — Vladimir Engelhardt — 18 March 1971 — "Ways and objective knowledge of chemistry in life"
- XXVIII. — Jacob Sirkin — 3 March 1972 — "non-rigid molecules"
- XXIX. — Nikolai Javoronkov — 5 March 1973—DI "Mendeleev—the herald of STR"
- XXX. — Nikolai Kochetkov — 21 March 1974 — "Development of synthesis of carbohydrate chemistry"
- XXXI. — Sergey Frisch — 20 March 1975 — "Spectroscopy of atomic and molecular compounds"
- XXXII. — Yuri Ovchinnikov — 25 March 1976 — "Advances in the study of protein structure"
- XXXIII. — Alexei Storonkin — 24 March 1977 — "Questions of thermodynamics of heterogeneous systems"
- XXXIV. — Boris Arbuzov — 16 February 1978 — "Reactions of cycloaddition by aliphatic and aromatic acyl-izotsianits"
- XXXV. — Leonid Kostandov — 16 February 1979 — "Chemical Science and Industry"
- XXXVI. — Konstantin Yatsymyrsky — 29 March 1980 — "Biological Aspects of Inorganic Chemistry"
- XXXVII. — Nikolay Yenikolopov — 12 March 1981 — "Chemical transformations of organic compounds in the solid phase during plastic flow"
- XXXVIII. — Anatoly Alexandrov — 4 February 1982 — "Problems of power at the turn of 20th and 21st centuries"
- XXXIX. — Mikhail Shultz — 24 March 1983 — "Chemistry of oxide glasses and their electrode properties"
- XL. — Viktor Spitsyn — 5 April 1984 — "New laws in the ratios of chemical elements in the periodic Mendeleyev"
- XLI. — Oleg Reutov — 11 April 1985 — "Some aspects of organometallic chemistry of non-transition metals"
- XLII. — Yakov Kolotyrkin — 11 February 1986 — "Corrosion of Metals
- XLIII. — Valentin Koptyug — 12 February 1987 — "Problems of systematising chemical knowledge"
- XLIV. — Vitaly Gol'danskii — 25 March 1988 — "Quantum kinetics of low-temperature chemical reactions"
- XLV. — Viktor Kabanov — 25 March 1989 — "Statistical mikromrolekuly in living systems"
- XLVI. — Mark Volpin — 1 March 1990 — "New ways of activation of saturated hydrocarbons"
- XLVII. — Nikolay Zefirov — 28 March 1991 — "The use of computers as artificial intelligence in organic chemistry"
- XLVIII. — Yuri Molin — 19 March 1992 — "Magnetic effects and spin coherence in the radial reactions"
- XLIX. — Zhores Alferov — 19 February 1993 — "Semiconductor heterostructures"
- L. — Yuri Buslaev — 10 March 1994 — "Inorganic Materials Today"
- LI. — Alexander Shilov — 16 March 1995 — "Biomimetic catalysis"
- LII. — Vladimir Skulachev — 14 March 1996 — "Oxygen in living systems: good and evil"
- LIII. — Georgy Samsonov — 6 March 1997 — "Chromatographic bioseparatsiya and biopolymer systems"
- LIV. — Ilya Moiseev — 19 March 1998 — "Activation of hydrogen peroxide metal complexes: molecular path"
- LV. — Anatoly Rusanov — 18 March 1999 — "Wonderful World of Micelles"
- LVI. — Anatoly Buchachenko — 2 March 2000 — "Chemistry at the Turn of the Century: New Horizons"
- LVII. — Irina Beletskaya — 1 February 2001 — "Organometallic chemistry: Past and Future"
- LVIII. — Vladimir Boldyrev — 21 March 2002 — "Reactivity of solids. Problems and Prospects "
- LIX. — Boris Trofimov — 27 March 2003 — "Superbasic catalysts and reagents: concept, applications and perspectives"
- LX. — Renad Sagdeev — 12 February 2004 — "Magnetic phenomena in chemistry, biology and medicine"
- LXI. — Yuri Oganesyan — 17 March 2005 — "Superheavy Elements"
- LXII. — Vladimir Minkin — 16 March 2006 — "Polyfunctional materials for molecular electronics"
- LXIII. — Yuri Zolotov — 22 March 2007 — "Analytical Chemistry: the day today"
- LXIV. — Oleg Chupakhin — 20 March 2008 — "Nucleophilic aromatic substitution of hydrogen—an efficient synthetic methodology"
- LXV. — Vladimir Fortov — 12 March 2009 — "Extreme states of matter".
- LXVI. — Alexei Khokhlov — 18 February 2010 — "Smart Polymers".
