= Zoubek =

Zoubek (feminine Zoubková) is a Czech surname meaning literally a "little tooth". Notable people with the surname include:

- Brian Zoubek (born 1988), American basketball player
- David Zoubek, Czech footballer
- Olbram Zoubek (1926–2017), Czech sculptor and designer
- Vladimír Zoubek (1903–1995), Czech geologist
- Bohuš Zoubek (1942–2017), Czech horn player and music teacher
