= Jaroslav Kožešník =

Czech mathematician and politician

Jaroslav Kožešník (8 June 1907 – 26 June 1985) was a Czech mathematician, scientist and politician. He was an expert in mechanics and automation (cybernetics) and worked as an editor-in-chief of the Kybernetika journal. He was a chairman of the Czechoslovak Academy of Sciences (1969–1970, 1970–1977, 1977–1980), a Communist Party functionary in Socialist Czechoslovakia and a member of the parliament during the normalization period. He was a recipient of several state awards.

== Life ==
Kožešník was born on 8 June 1907 in Kněžice, Bohemia, Austria-Hungary. He died on 26 June 1985 in Prague.

== Books ==
- 1983: Teorie podobnosti a modelování
- 1979: Kmitání mechanických soustav
- 1965: Základy teorie přístrojů (Principles of the Theory of Machines)
- 1960: Dynamika strojů (Dynamics of Machines), translated into English, German, Russian, Polish
- 1960: Mechanika elektrických strojů točivých (The Mechanics of Electrical Rotating Machines), translated into several languages
- 1947: Fysikální podobnost a stavba modelů

== Awards ==
Honorary title of the Hero of Socialist Labor of Czechoslovak Socialist Republic, the Order of the Republic, the Order of the Victorious February, Order of Labour, A. Zápotockého medal with ribbon, the Soviet Order of the Red Banner of Labour, Order of Friendship of Peoples (awarded by the Presidium of the Supreme Soviet of the Soviet Union), Star friendship Nations in gold (awarded by the State Council of the GDR). For scientific merit is twice laureate of the Klement Gottwald State Prize, received the highest scientific honors the Academy of Sciences of the Soviet Union, Lomonosov Gold Medal, two honorary gold plaques of the SCAS "For Merits of science and humanity" and a plaque of Zdeněk Nejedlý.
