= Vladimir Minkin =

Russian chemist

Vladimir Isaakovich Minkin
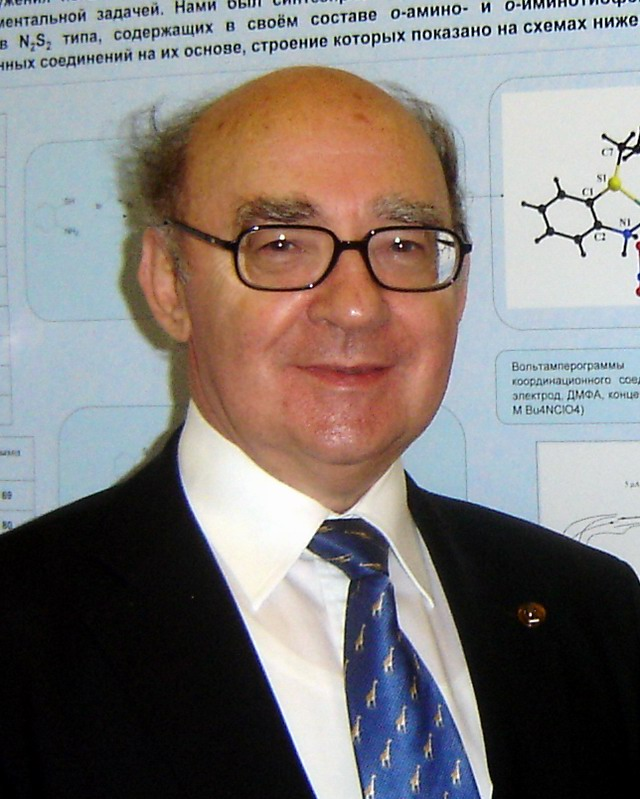
- Born: Vladimir Isaakovich Minkin; Владимир Исаакович Минкин; 4 March 1935 (age 91); Rostov-on-Don
- Occupation: chemist

Vladimir Isaakovich Minkin (Russian: Владимир Исаакович Минкин; born 4 March 1935, Rostov-on-Don) is a Russian chemist. Professor, Doctor of Chemical Sciences.

== Biography ==
Vladimir Isaakovich Minkin graduated from the Chemical Faculty of Rostov State University in 1957. Since 1967 he was a Professor of the Department of Natural Compounds, in 1981-2012 — Director of the Research Institute of Physical Organic Chemistry of the RSU (SFedU). Since 2003 he was Vice-Chairman of the Southern Scientific Center of the Russian Academy of Sciences, in 2004-2009 — head of the Department of Natural and High-Molecular Compounds of the Southern Federal University. Since 2012 — scientific supervisor of SFedU.

Corresponding Member of the USSR Academy of Sciences since 1990, full member of the Russian Academy of Sciences since 1994 (Department of General and Technical Chemistry). Member of the Royal Society of Chemistry (1994).

His main works are devoted to physical organic and quantum chemistry. He studied the structure and molecular dynamics of organic and organometallic compounds.

In 1974 he discovered (together with Lev Olekhnovich and Yuri Zhdanov) the phenomenon of acylotrophy — rapid reversible migration of acyl groups between nucleophilic centers in organic molecules. He was the founder of a new scientific field — chemistry of structurally nonrigid molecules in the ground and excited states. He developed the theory of orbital stabilization of "nonclassical" structures of organic compounds. He also studied tautomerism and photochromism of organic compounds, stereodynamics of coordination compounds, nonclassical organic and elementorganic structures, bistable molecular systems with light-controlled reversible rearrangements.

In 1999 he was the writer of the final draft, (but not the only chemist beyond this new gold standards: the cooperation between researchers was the key of this achievement) which is the "Glossary of terms used in theoretical organic chemistry"

He is a member of the editorial board of such journals as "Advances in Heterocyclic Chemistry", "Mendeleev Communications", "Russian Chemical Reviews", "Journal of General Chemistry", "Journal of Organic Chemistry" and so on. He is also the author of 12 monographs and more than 800 articles in both Russian and foreign journals. Currently he is of the most cited Russian scientists.

Laureate of USSR State Prize (1989). LXII Mendeleev reader (2006).

== Bibliography ==
- Минкин В. И., Осипов О. А., Жданов Ю. А. Дипольные моменты в органической химии. — Л.: Химия, 1968. — 246 с.
- Minkin V. I., Osipov O. A., Zhdanov Yu. A. Dipole Moments in Organic Chemistry. — New York: Plenum Press, 1970. — 288 p.
- Минкин В. И., Олехнович Л. П., Жданов Ю. А. Молекулярный дизайн таутомерных систем. — Ростов н/Д: Изд-во Ростов. ун-та, 1977. — 272 с.
- Minkin V. I., Olekhnovich L. P., Zhdanov Yu. A. Molecular Design of Tautomeric Compounds. — Dordrecht-Boston-Tokyo: Kluwer Publ., 1988. — 280 p.
- Минкин В. И., Симкин Б. Я., Миняев Р. М. Квантовая химия органических соединений: Механизмы реакций. — М.: Химия, 1986. — 246 с.
- Минкин В. И., Миняев Р. М. Неклассические структуры органических соединений. — Ростов н/Д: Изд-во Рост. ун-та, 1985. — 164 с.
- Minkin V. I., Glukhovtsev M. N., Simkin B. Ya. Aromaticity and Antiaromaticity: Electronic and Structural Aspects. — New York: Wiley Intersci., 1994. — 336 p.
- Минкин В. И., Симкин Б. Я., Миняев Р. М. Теория строения молекул: Учеб. пособие для вузов (2-е изд., перераб. и доп.). — Ростов н/Д: Феникс, 1997. — 558 с.
