= Mikhail Sadovsky =

Russian physicist (1904–1994)

- Born: Mikhail Aleksandrovich Sadovsky; 6 November 1904; Saint Petersburg, Russian Empire
- Died: 12 October 1994 (aged 89); Moscow, Russia
- Occupation: Geophysicist
- Title: Doctor of Science; Professor
- Awards: Hero of Socialist Labour (1949), Lomonosov Gold Medal (1985)

Mikhail Aleksandrovich Sadovsky (Russian: Михаил Александрович Садовский; 6 November 1904 – 12 October 1994) was a Soviet geophysicist, academician (1966), and Hero of Socialist Labour (1949). Awarded the Lomonosov Gold Medal (1985), Lenin Prize (1962), four Stalin Prizes (1948, 1949, 1951, 1953).
