= Heřmanův Městec =

- Town
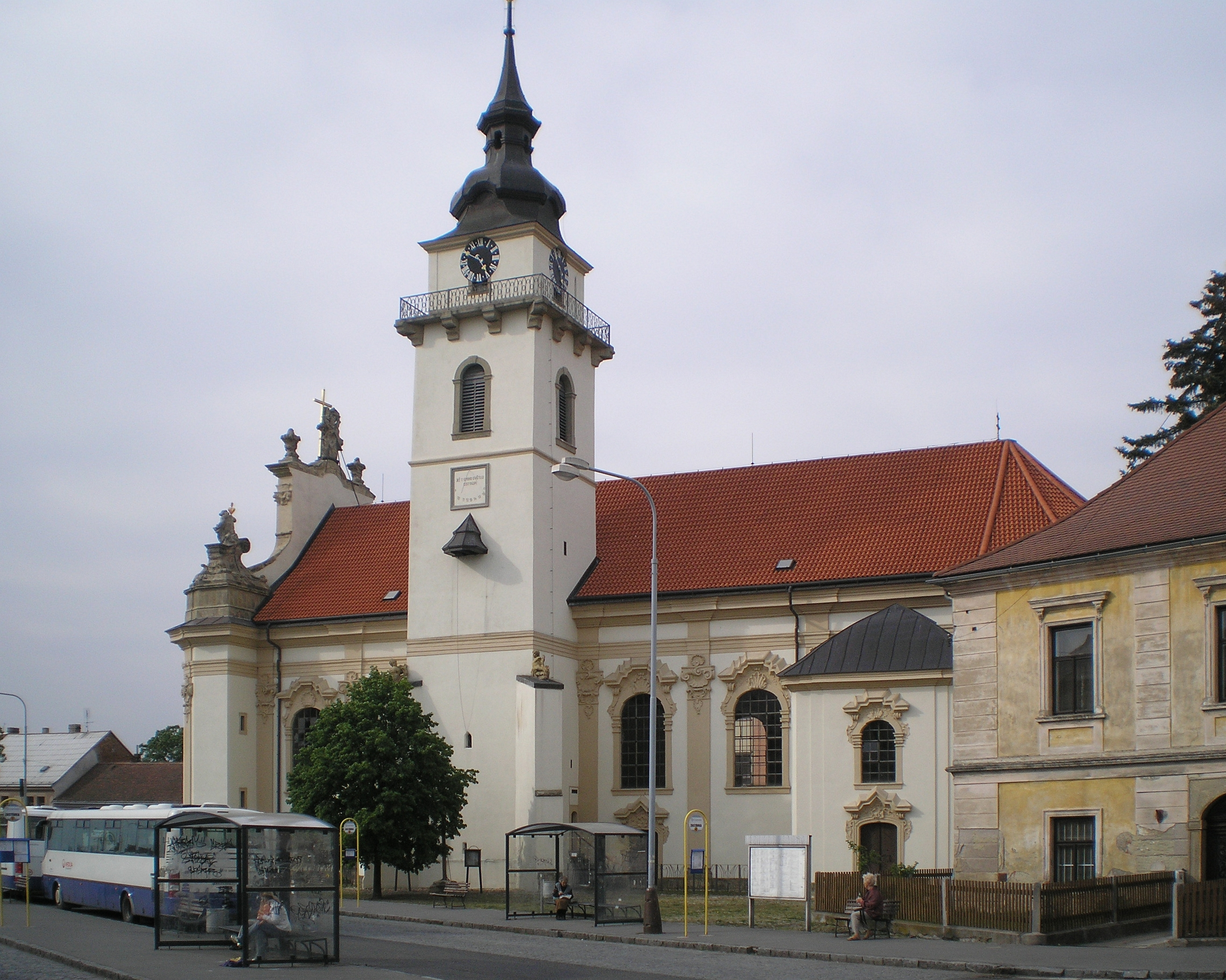
- Church of Saint Bartholomew

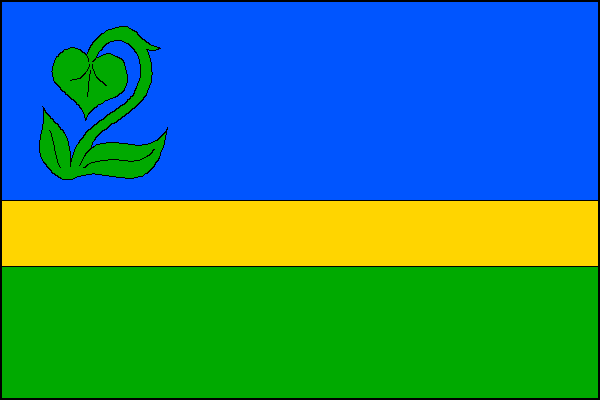
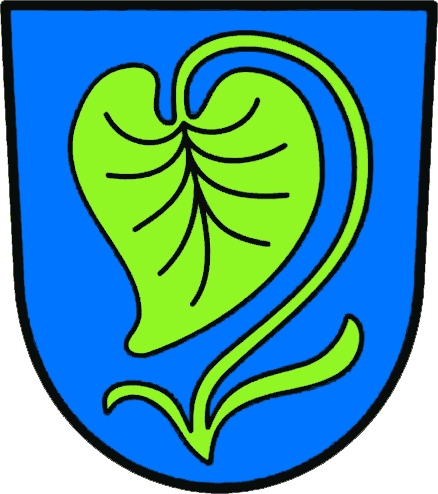
- Flag Coat of arms

- Location in the Czech Republic
- Coordinates: 49°56′50″N 15°39′54″E
- Country: Czech Republic
- Region: Pardubice
- District: Chrudim
- First mentioned: 1325

Government
  - Mayor: Aleš Jiroutek

Area
  - Total: 14.34 km^{2} (5.54 sq mi)
- Elevation: 280 m (920 ft)

Population (2026-01-01)
  - Total: 4,933
  - Density: 344.0/km^{2} (891.0/sq mi)
- Time zone: UTC+1 (CET)
  - Summer (DST): UTC+2 (CEST)
- Postal code: 538 03
- Website: www.hermanuv-mestec.cz

Heřmanův Městec (Czech pronunciation: [ˈɦɛr̝manuːf ˈmɲɛstɛts]; German: Hermannstädtel) is a town in Chrudim District in the Pardubice Region of the Czech Republic. It has about 4,900 inhabitants. The town proper is located on the stream Podolský potok in the Svitavy Uplands.

Heřmanův Městec was founded around 1280. Among the main landmarks of the town are the Church of Saint Bartholomew and Heřmanův Městec Castle. The historic town centre with the castle complex is well preserved and is protected as an urban monument zone.

== Administrative division ==
Heřmanův Městec consists of four municipal parts (in brackets population according to the 2021 census):

- Heřmanův Městec (4,290)
- Chotěnice (304)
- Konopáč (140)
- Radlín (35)

== Etymology ==
The name means "Heřman's little town" in Czech.

== Geography ==
Heřmanův Městec is located about 9 kilometres (6 mi) west of Chrudim and 11 km (7 mi) southwest of Pardubice. It lies mostly in the Svitavy Uplands. The southern part of the municipal territory extends into the Iron Mountains. The highest point is at 382 m (1,253 ft) above sea level. The stream Podolský potok flows through the town.

== History ==
Heřmanův Městec was founded around 1280 on a trade route from Prague to Moravia. The first written mention of Heřmanův Městec is from 1325, when it was already described as a small town. In that time, it was owned by the local nobleman Heřman of Mrtice, but it is not certain whether this is the same Heřman after whom the settlement was named. Due to its location and later due to the large Jewish community, the town became the economic centre of the region. Heřmanův Městec was burned down during the Hussite Wars. It was also repeatedly conquered and looted during the Thirty Years' War.

The town greatly developed during the rule of Counts of Sporck, who acquired it in 1695. The Sporcks had built stone houses to prevent the effects of fires, extended the local castle, and reconstructed the church destroyed by fire in 1740. In 1828, Heřmanův Městec was bought by the Kinsky family. The Kinsky family continued to improve the town and had built the hospital or the orphanage, and had extended the castle and the castle park to its current form.

In 1875, Heřmanův Městec became the first place in Bohemia where association football was played. In 1882 and 1899, the railways were built.

=== Jewish community ===
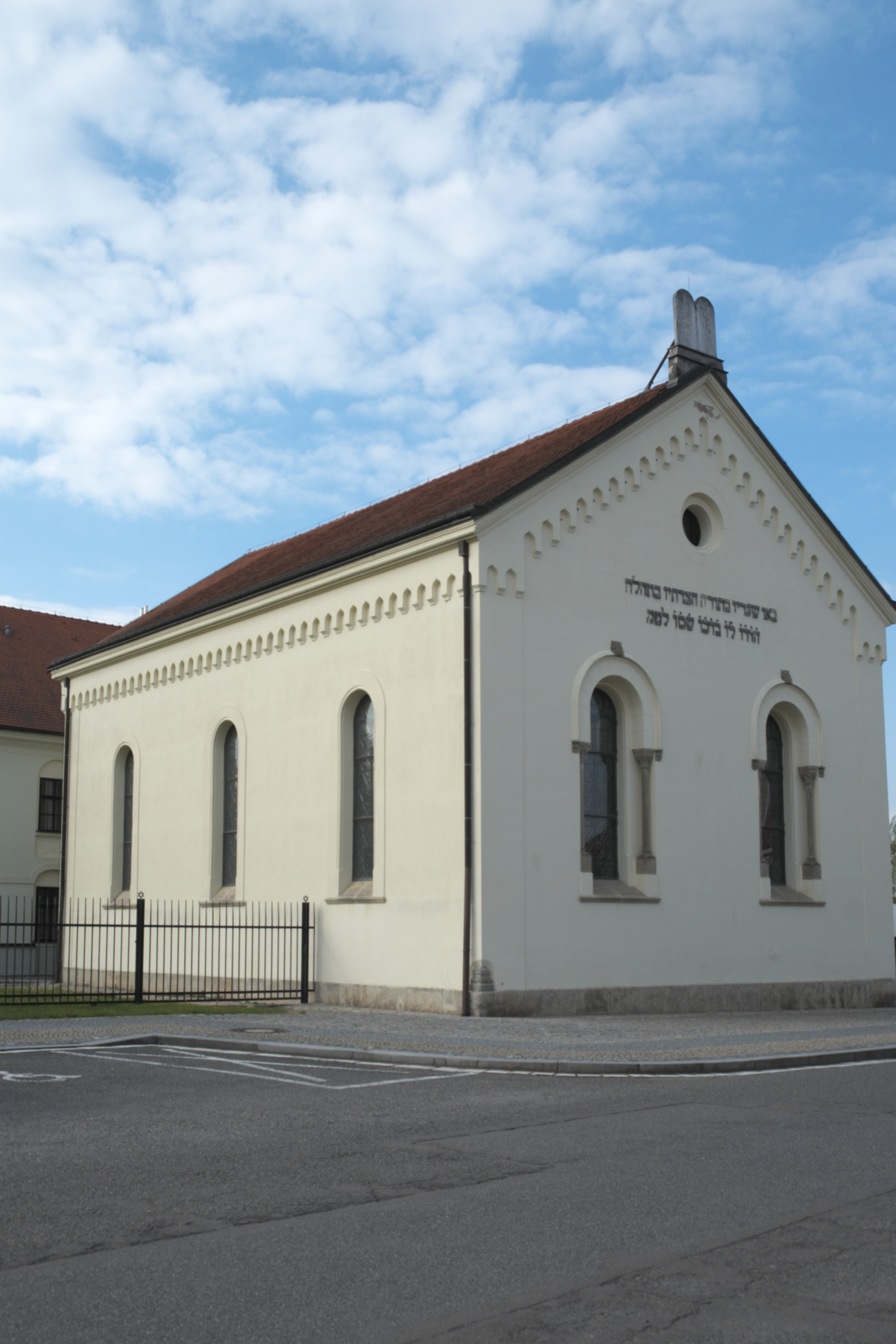
The synagogue

Jews were living in Heřmanův Městec as early as the first half of the 15th century and it represents one of the oldest documented Jewish communities in the Chrudim District. A minyan (10 adult Jewish males) was recorded as early as 1570. The Jewish community continued to grow and thrive over the years.

==== The beginnings of the community ====
The town was the property of a series of aristocratic landowners who enjoyed a mostly positive relationship with the Jewish community. The Jewish community paid a fixed annual sum of money to the landowning gentry. During the 16th, 17th, and 18th centuries, Jews living in the town were mainly engaged in trade (linen, wool, hides, or feathers) and money-lending. The location of the town along the road connecting Prague with Moravia brought a great number of merchants into the area.

According to oral tradition, the Jewish cemetery in town dates back to the 1430. Usually, when Jews move into an area, one of their first community actions is to purchase land for a cemetery. There is documentation from 1667 that additional land was purchased for the purpose of enlarging the Jewish cemetery. There are records of additional extensions that took place in 1685, 1709, 1723 and 1838. The date of the construction of the first synagogue is unclear, but it was destroyed in a large town fire in 1623.

In 1661, Count Jan Karel Sporck became the owner of the estate which included the town. Under his administration, the local Jewish community flourished. The Count encouraged Jews to move into houses that were abandoned during the Thirty Years' War along a single street leading to the Jewish cemetery (now called Havlíčkova Street). He allowed the Jews to rebuild their synagogue.

In 1680, the town was visited by a plague that claimed many lives, leaving a large number of dilapidated houses behind. In 1686, Count Ferdinand Leopold Sporck called upon the Jews from the region to inhabit the abandoned houses. At the turn of the 17th century, the town became the seat of the regional rabbi.

==== Repression and emancipation in 1726–1939 ====
The ruling Habsburgs introduced restrictions on Jewish movement, residence, marriage, and other matters of everyday life. In 1727 the vice regent's office in Prague confirmed a regulation concerning the distance between Jewish dwellings and Christian churches that led to the synagogue of Heřmanův Městec being torn down because it was too close to the town's Catholic church. Eventually, Jewish self-government was abolished, and the Jewish settlement was surrounded by an enclosure with three gates. All Jews were required to live in this part of town, effectively establishing a Jewish ghetto in Heřmanův Městec.

Until construction of a new synagogue in the Baroque style in 1760, the Jewish community used a private home as a house of prayer. Count Jan Václav Sporck, who then owned the town's land, is said to have financially supported construction and laid the foundation stone for the new synagogue, which is in the same location as the current synagogue.

For over a century, the Jews of Bohemia had to endure a number of restrictions. In 1848 serfdom was abolished, and the Jews living in Heřmanův Městec were emancipated and allowed freedom of movement. As a result, many Jews left the town for employment opportunities in industrialised cities such as Prague or emigrated abroad.

In 1870 construction of new synagogue, with the backing of the aristocratic landowner, on the same site as the 1760 building was started. This building was in the Neo-Romanesque style by the architect František Schmoranz. The architect had some lofty plans which had to be abandoned because the Catholic clergy feared that the synagogue might outshine the nearby Church of St. Bartholomew. The original design had a tower with a stairway leading to the women's gallery. After design changes, the synagogue provided access to the women's gallery via a covered passageway from the school building next door. A stone-hewn image of the Ten Commandants adorned the top of the building. Due to the reduction in size, the building was not really sufficient to support the large crowds which attended worship services especially on holidays. As the Jewish population declined toward the latter part of the 19th century, the building became sufficient.

With the relaxation of restrictions on Jews, by the late 1800s the town and its Jewish inhabitants had a thriving role in the production of shoes. There were several Jewish-owned handmade and machine-made shoe production companies. Most of these companies had international exports. As Jews were now permitted to study without restriction, many of them also pursued opportunities as attorneys, physicians, and other professions. In 1891, Heřmanův Městec became the seat of a district rabbi, with the dependent communities being Chrudim, Hroubovice, and Dřevíkov. While the town itself had less than 100 Jewish inhabitants, it served a broader Jewish community of 500 Jews in the region.

==== German occupation and postwar ====
From 16 March 1939, the Jewish community was under the rule of Nazi Germany and the Nuremberg Laws restricting Jewish rights were the law of the land. In 1940, Jews living in the Protectorate of Bohemia and Moravia were deprived of the ability to do business, they were dismissed from government service, Jewish children were denied the right to attend school, and worship and assembly were forbidden. In Heřmanův Městec the Ten Commandments on the synagogue were removed, and the building was used by the German army for storage.

During the occupation by Nazi Germany, Jewish ritual objects, including over a dozen Torah scrolls, were transported to the Jewish Museum in Prague. These eventually became part of the Memorial Scrolls Trust collection housed at the Westminster Synagogue in London. It is likely that so many Torah scrolls were attributed to Heřmanův Městec because it was the seat of the district rabbi. As the Jewish community in the area shrank during the late 1800s and early 1900s and other synagogues closed their doors, their Torah scrolls probably were sent to the synagogue in Heřmanův Městec. Thus, by 1940, Heřmanův Městec had a large inventory of Torah scrolls.

On 3 December 1942, all of the 60 Jews were transported to the Theresienstadt Ghetto. Many of those were eventually transported to Auschwitz.

In 1945 at the end of World War II, only two members of the Jewish community returned to Heřmanův Městec. After World War II the synagogue was used mainly as a warehouse. The synagogue, rabbi's house, and cemetery received little maintenance or care and deteriorated. At one point, the Bohemian Brethren Evangelic Church purchased the synagogue and adjacent rabbi's house which were used as a storeroom and a prayer house, respectively. Many of the former homes of the Jewish community were razed between 1980 and 1982 as part of a redevelopment effort.

==== Historic population ====
In 1570, ten Jewish families lived in Heřmanův Městec. In 1724, there were 277 Jews in the town. The Jewish community reached its peak in 1849, when it numbered 840 Jews. In 1880, there was 434 Jews in the town, which dropped to 240 in 1900. Only 87 Jews remained in the town in 1921, which further decreased to 60 in 1939.

== Demographics ==
Historical population

Year	Pop.	±%
1869	4,746	—
1880	5,095	+7.4%
1890	5,078	−0.3%
1900	5,120	+0.8%
1910	5,045	−1.5%

Year	Pop.	±%
1921	4,649	−7.8%
1930	4,370	−6.0%
1950	3,585	−18.0%
1961	4,137	+15.4%
1970	4,312	+4.2%

Year	Pop.	±%
1980	5,003	+16.0%
1991	5,046	+0.9%
2001	4,885	−3.2%
2011	4,997	+2.3%
2021	4,769	−4.6%

Source: Censuses

== Transport ==
The I/17 road (the section from Chrudim to Čáslav) runs through the town.

Heřmanův Městec is the starting point of a short railway line to Choceň.

== Sights ==
=== Synagogue ===
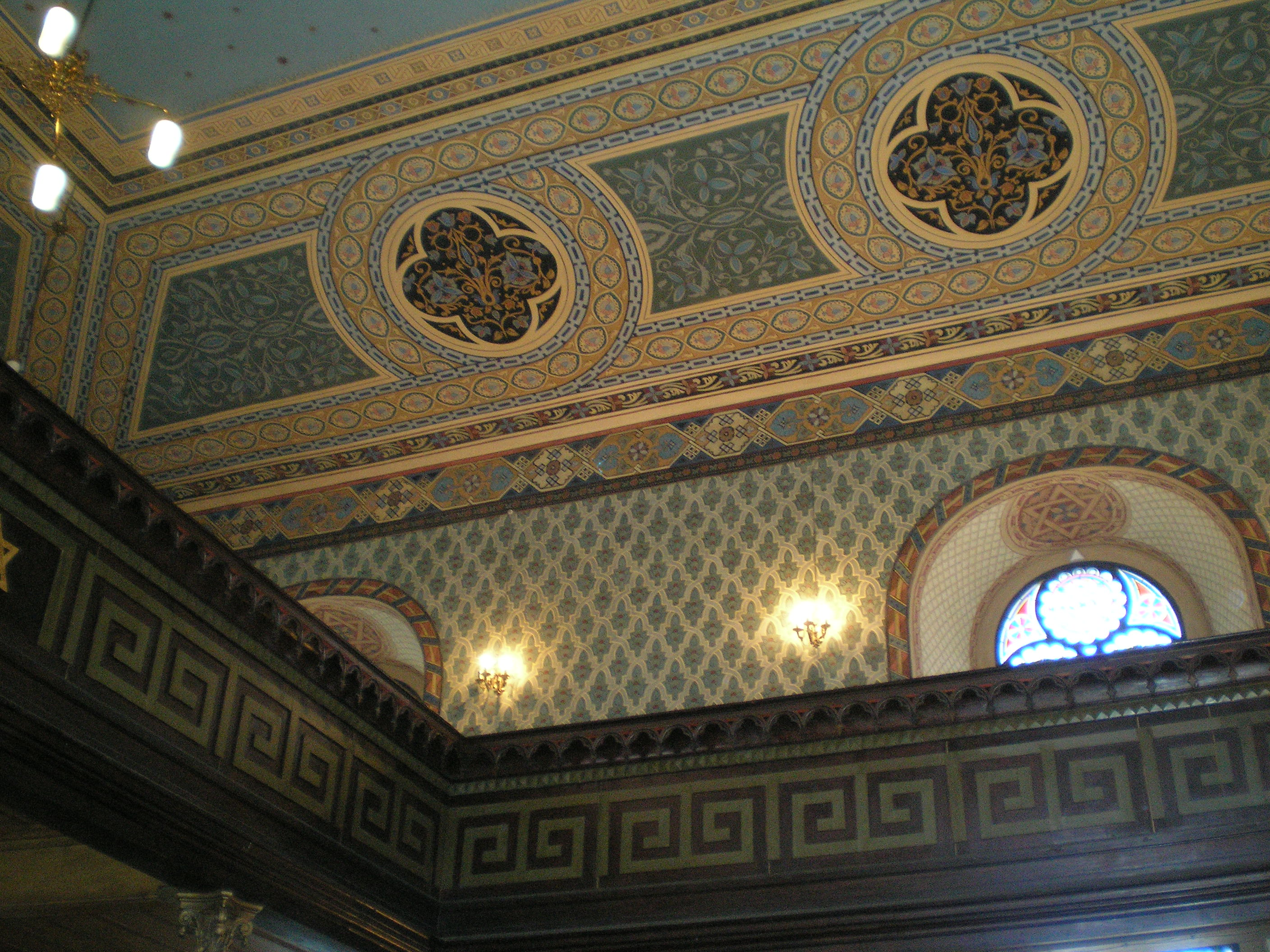
Interior of the restored synagogue at Heřmanův Městec

In 1986, the Town of Heřmanův Městec purchased the synagogue. In the early 1990s, the cemetery, mortuary and caretaker's home were restored. In 1991, the synagogue and the cemetery were declared national cultural monuments. Using plans from 1870, the synagogue building and adjacent rabbi's house were restored in 2001. The synagogue was furnished with replicas of the original benches, and the painting and stained glass windows were restored. The only major architectural change is the size of the bimah (area where the Torah is read). It was enlarged to better serve as a stage in support of its new role as a concert hall. The rabbi's house is now the home of the Cyrany art gallery.

=== Jewish cemetery ===
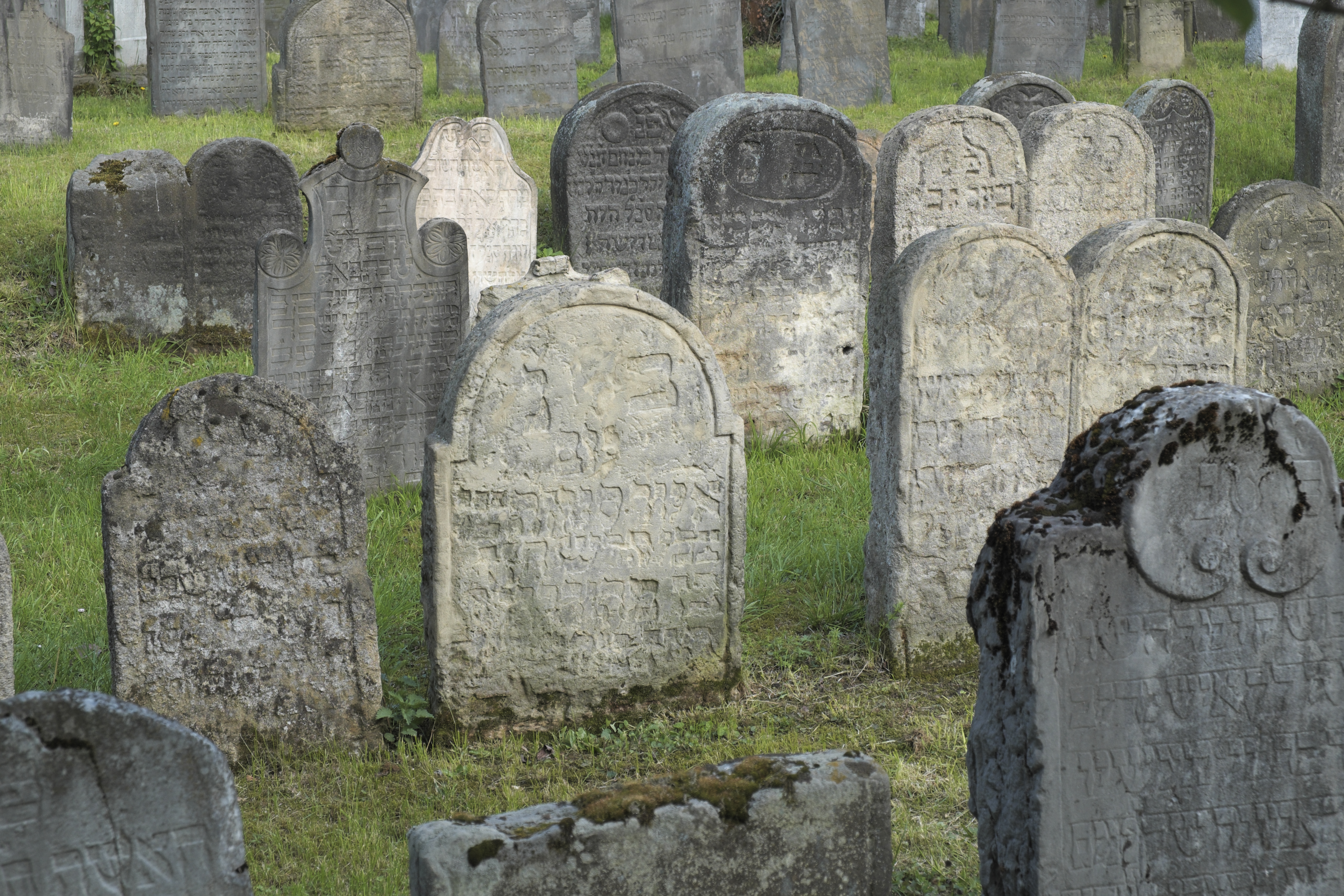
Jewish cemetery

The Jewish cemetery was probably founded in the early 15th century and is among the oldest and best preserved Jewish cemeteries in the Czech Republic. It has an area of almost 4,000 square meters, and contains 1,077 tombstones. It is owned by the Jewish community of Prague. The oldest preserved and legible gravestone is from 1647. The tombstones, especially the older ones, are mostly made from sandstone; the newer stones are made from marble. The cemetery includes the caretaker's house and mortuary from 1838 with a memorial plaque to the victims of Nazism and a hearse.

=== Church of Saint Bartholomew ===
The Church of Saint Bartholomew is a main landmark of the town and whole region. It was built in the late Baroque style in 1756–1761. It has a 42-metre (138 ft)-high tower.

=== Heřmanův Městec Castle ===
The castle was also built in the late Baroque style. It was created in the 1784 by extensive reconstruction of a fortress. Since 1952, the premises of the castle houses a retirement home. In 1784, the adjacent castle park was established from the former game reserve. It is a large English landscape garden with the fishpond Zámecký rybník in the middle. The area of the park is protected as a nature monument.

== Notable people ==
- Moses Löb Bloch (1815–1909), Hungarian rabbi; worked here in 1852–1855
- Václav Dobruský (1858–1916), archaeologist
- Rudolf, 9th Prince Kinsky of Wchinitz and Tettau (1859–1930), nobleman
- Jiří Stanislav Guth-Jarkovský (1861–1943), sports administrator and writer
- Vladimír Zoubek (1903–1995), geologist
- Ludmila Seefried-Matějková (born 1938), sculptor
- Marek Výborný (born 1976), politician

== Twin towns – sister cities ==
Heřmanův Městec is twinned with:

- Bechyně, Czech Republic
