= Ludmila Seefried-Matějková =

Czech sculptor and painter

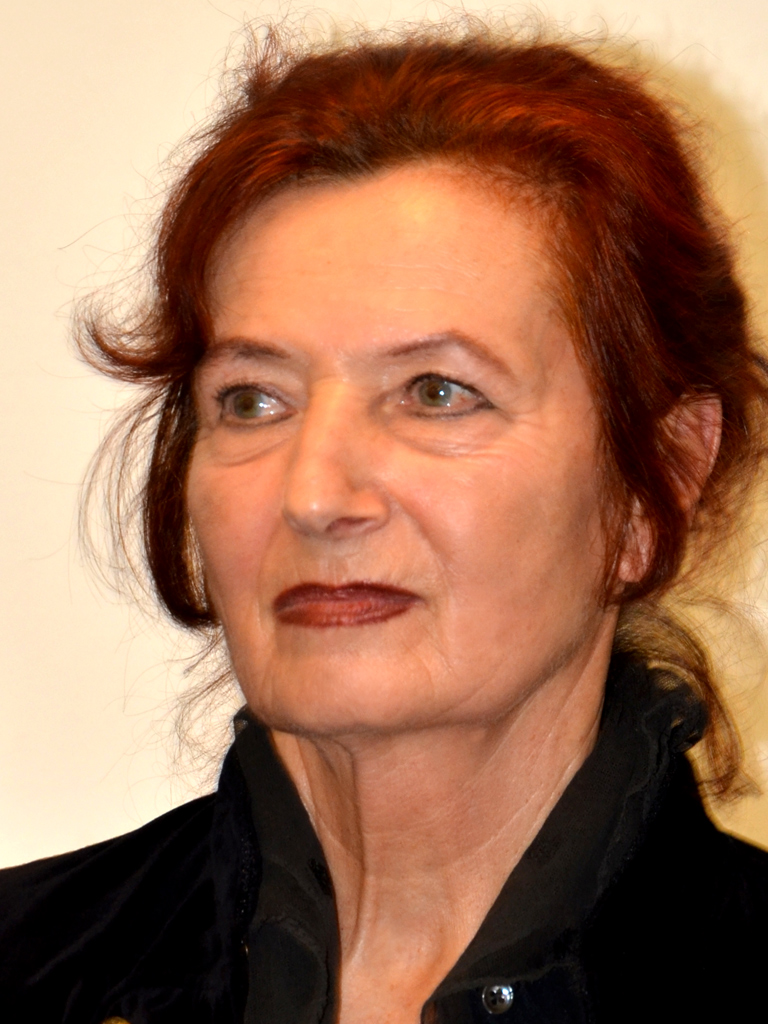
Seefried-Matějková in 2013

Ludmila Seefried-Matějková (born 13 November 1938) is a Czech sculptor and painter. She lives in Berlin.

== Biography ==
Ludmila Seefried-Matějková was born in Heřmanův Městec, where she spent her childhood and the war years. Her father, František Matějka, owned a sawmill, and her mother, Ludmila, looked after the family, household and garden. Music, painting and literature also played an important role in their lives.

After February 1948 the family was dispossessed and her father was displaced by force 250 km away from the family. Her mother and the two daughters were at the mercy of the new communist rulers. The trauma experienced during this period sharpened her awareness of injustice. In 1951, the whole family was forcibly displaced to Mariánské Lázně.

Matějková studied sculpture at Arts Grammar School in Prague with Prof. M. Uchytilová-Kucová (1953–1956) and made several attempts to enter university. In spite of passing examinations, she was rejected for political reasons. In between exams she undertook practical stonemason training and worked in a porcelain factory in Duchcov. After a last unsuccessful attempt in Bratislava she returned to Mariánské Lázně and worked for three years as an art teacher in Mariánské Lázně and Cheb and as a graphic artist at the Mariánské Lázně Arts Centre KaSS. At a local theatre Kruh/Circle in the arts centre she acts, sings, writes, and portrays friends.

Her daughter Marketa was born in 1965, but her marriage broke down and she divorced. In 1964 she submitted an application for membership in the Czech Artists Association (CSVU) and during the Prague Spring she grabbed the opportunity to study abroad. In 1967 she was admitted to the Berlin University of the Arts (HfBK) in West Berlin, in the sculptor class of Prof. Joe Henry Lonas.

She completed her studies in master class in 1973. Since then, she had been working as a freelance sculptor in Berlin. Here she met her husband, Rainer-Maria Seefried, received German nationality and decided to live in Germany.

In the 1990s Ludmila Seefried-Matejková was a founding member of the Künstlersonderbundes-Realism in Germany in Berlin (1990) and of the international arts association PRO ARTE VIVENDI in Berlin and Mariánské Lázně (1998). The projects are supported by the Czech Embassy in Berlin and the Deutsch Tschechischen Zukunfts-Fonds. In 1994 she became a member of the Darmstädter Sezession in Darmstadt.

She had several individual exhibitions in Germany and elsewhere in Europe. Seefried-Matějková lives and works in Berlin and Malcesine.

== Works ==
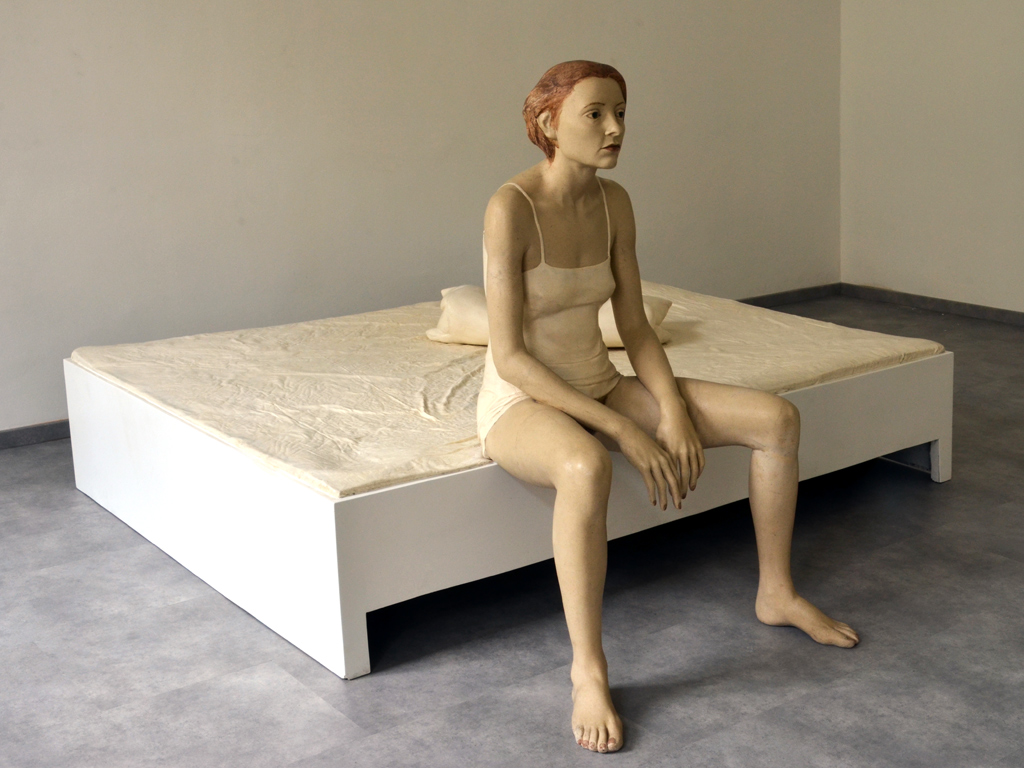
On the edge, polychrome polyester, wood (1976-77)

Ludmila Seefried-Matejkova studied figure sculpture under Prof.Marie Uchytilova-Kucova in Prague. She was able to look into the abstract form under Prof. Joe Henry Lonas. Her sculptures from this period were stylized anthropomorphic or bioform constructions in plaster.

She soon realized that abstraction limits her possibilities of expression and returned to figure sculpting. The hyper-realistic, life-size polyester figure "Hanna" (final work for master class at the HfBK 1973) marked out the future direction of her sculptural works. The effect of her figural sculptures was often intensified by environment installations: Scream 1976, On Edge 1977, Outside the Door 1980 and others.

Since 1980 she has returned to classic materials: clay, stone and wood. She takes her subjects from life around her, the city with its variety of human characters and their fates, the social differences to the fringes of society. A series of heads/busts of different characters, mainly in terracotta, were the Turkish Woman 1983, Homeless 1990, Cunning Stockbroker and Girl at the Exhibition 1996 and others. Her sculptures based on reality were transformed portraits of real people from everyday life, interpreted by the artist into her own sculptural language: Beggar Woman 1997, Underground 2001-2 and others. The sculpture Father`s Hat 1995 is a self-portrait.

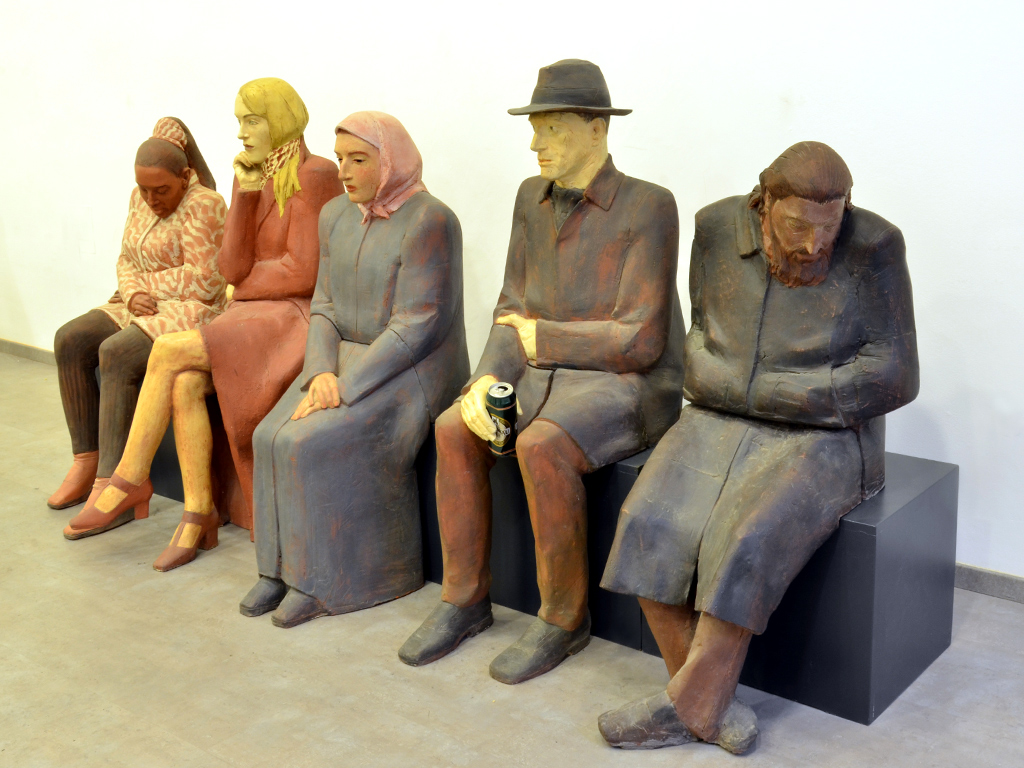
Metro, polychrome terracotta (2001–02)

Struck by her childhood and early youth experiences, she often depicts pain, violence and aggression as important themes in her work. She employs expressive symbols: Scream 1976, Strangling 1985, Homo homini lupus 1992/93, and Seed of Hatred 1993.

The world of the human soul with its silent dramas such as self-torment, anxiety and loneliness (Solitude 2004) as well as internal experiences, self-awareness such as contemplation and meditation are equally reflected in her works: Catharsis 1979, Meditation 1980 and 2002. Her summer works in stone and wood were created in her Italian studio. The subjects are partly biblical or influenced by her reading: Job 2003, Resurrection 2008, Ophelia 1997, Kafka/Metamorphosis 2000, Somnambulist 2013 and others.

Drawings were always an important part of Ludmila Seefried-Matejkova's works – from sketches in pubs, underground trains or on the beach to portraits and studies of people, mainly in pencil, charcoal, pastel or pen-and-ink.

As a representative of realism, which has quite a tradition in Germany, Ludmila Seefried-Matejkova was successful in several Kunst am Bau competitions Justice 1984, Double-Admiral 1985, The Dance on the Volcano 1988 and several other sculptural objects in the cityscape of Berlin.

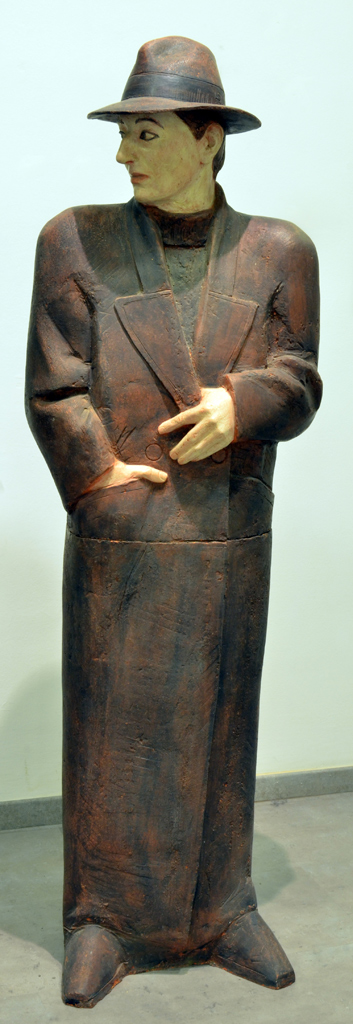
Father's Hat, polychrome terracotta, 1995

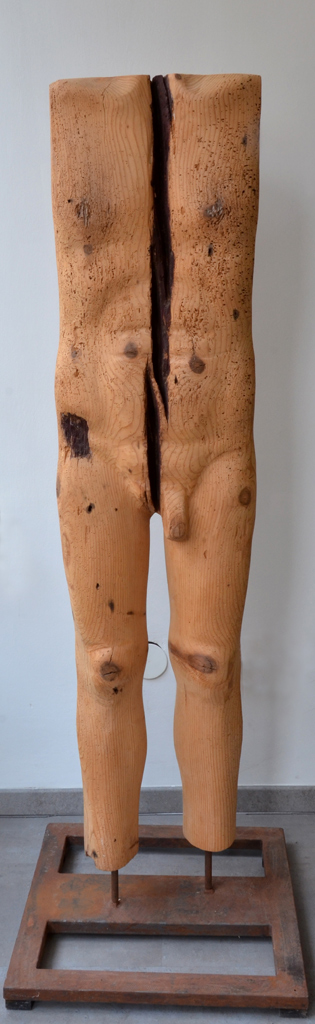
Job, wood, 2003

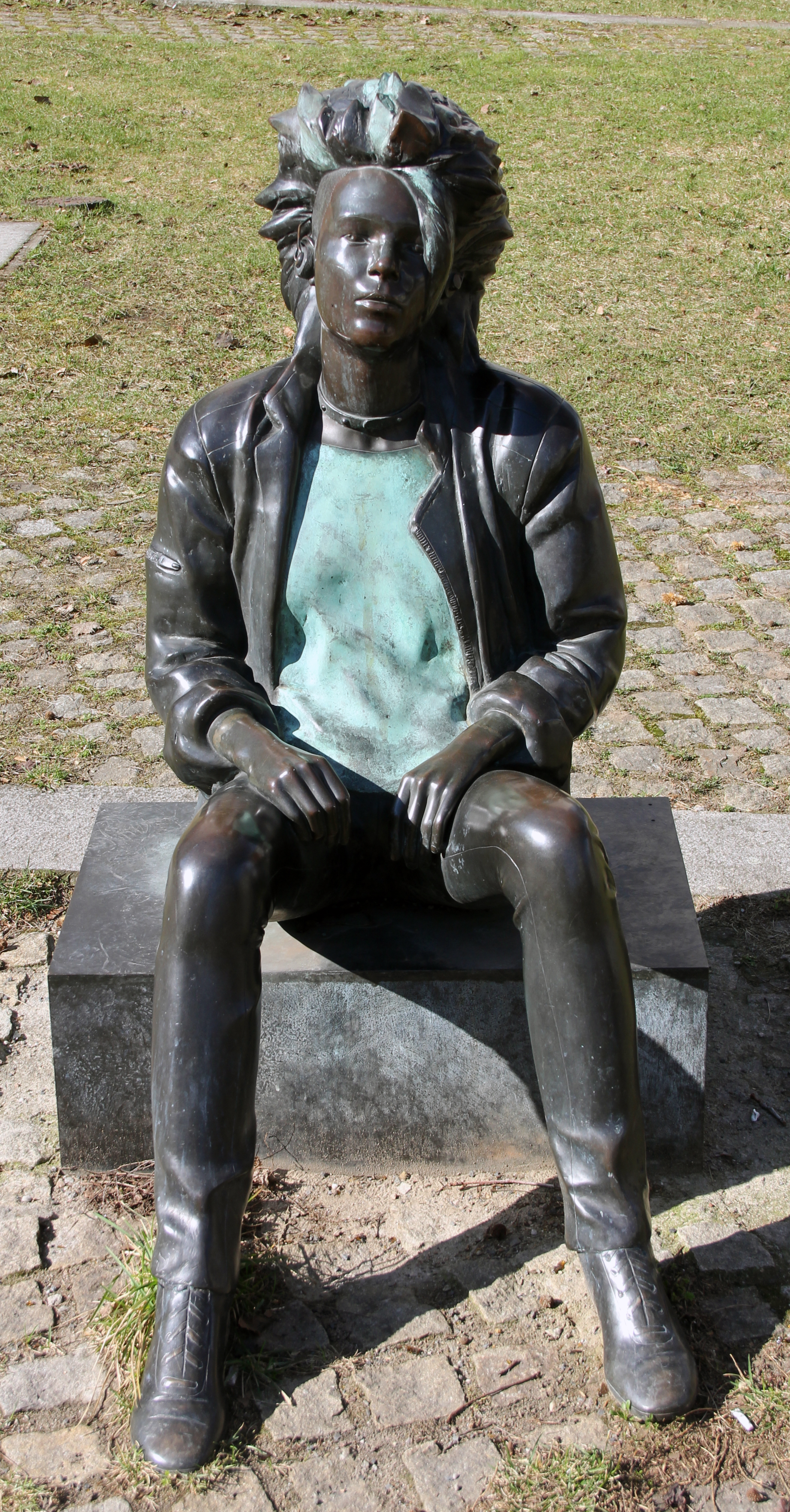
Walkman, Julius-Morgenroth-Platz, 1985

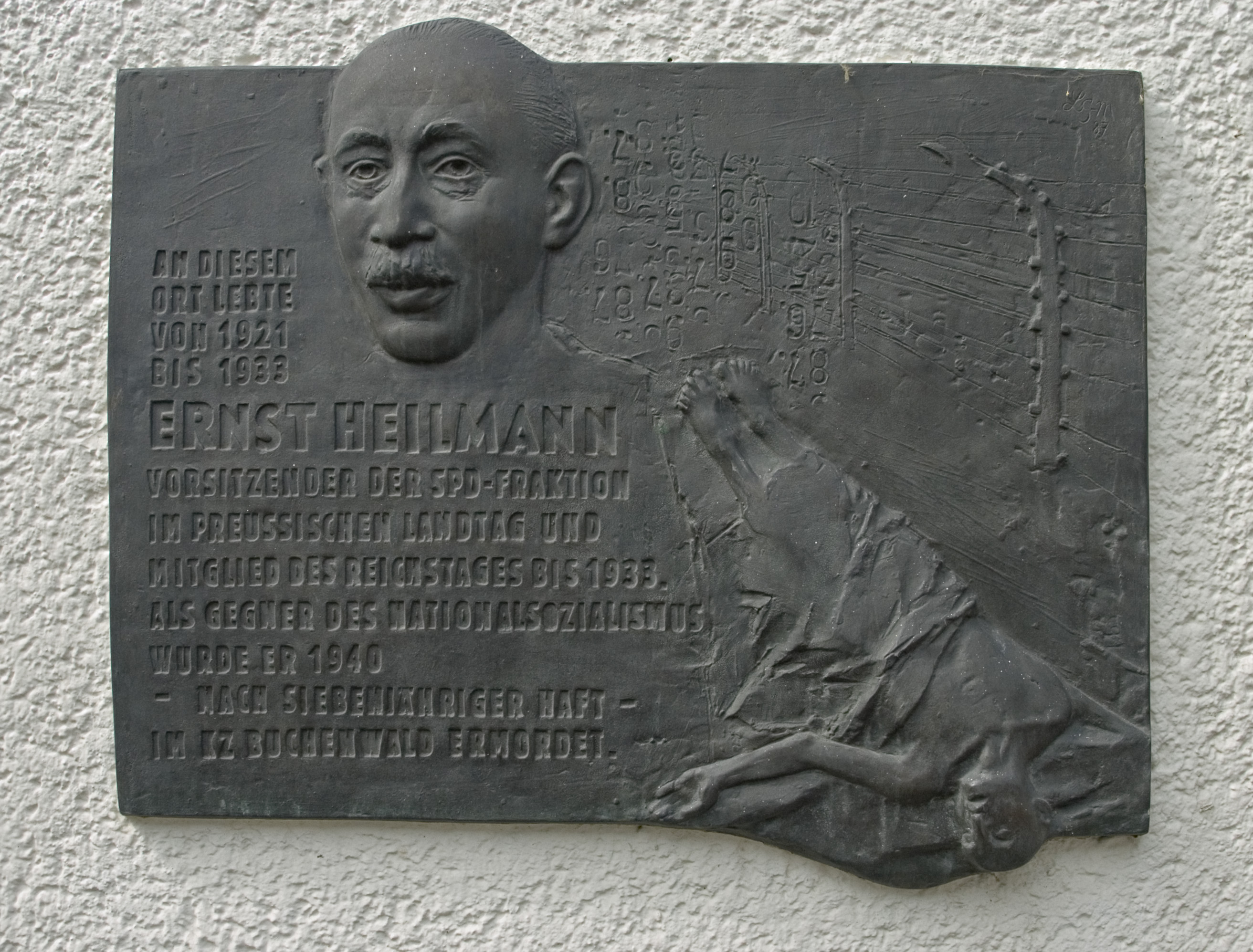
Ernst Heilmann Gedenktafel Brachvogelstraße 5

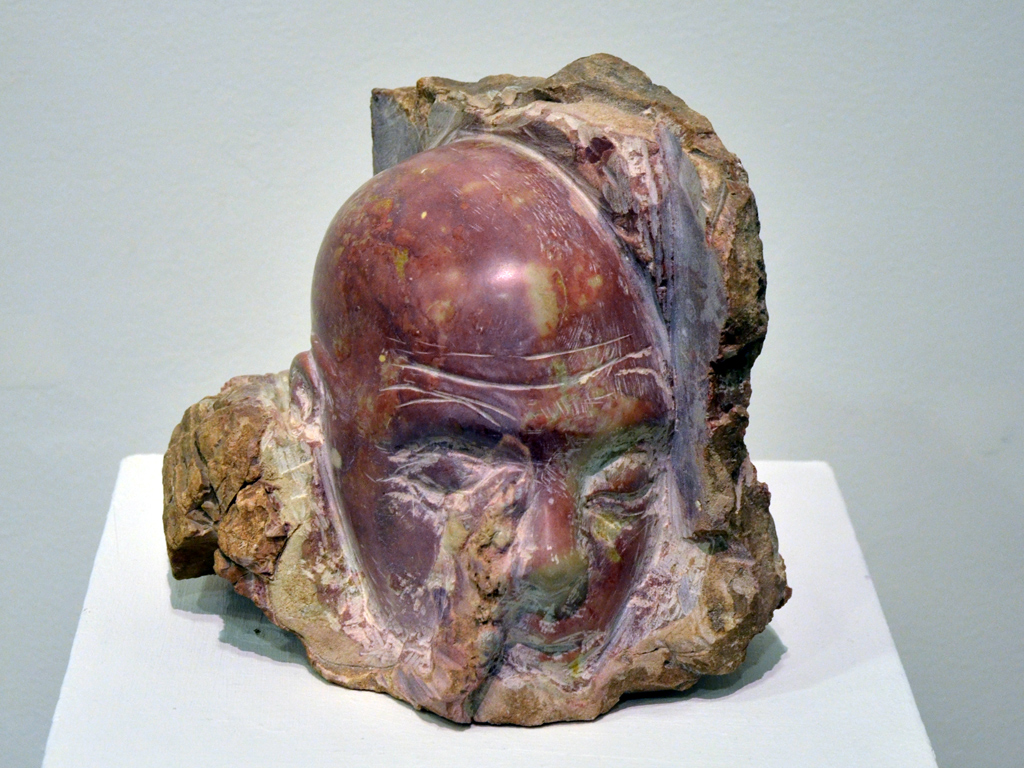
Resurrection, red marble, 1997

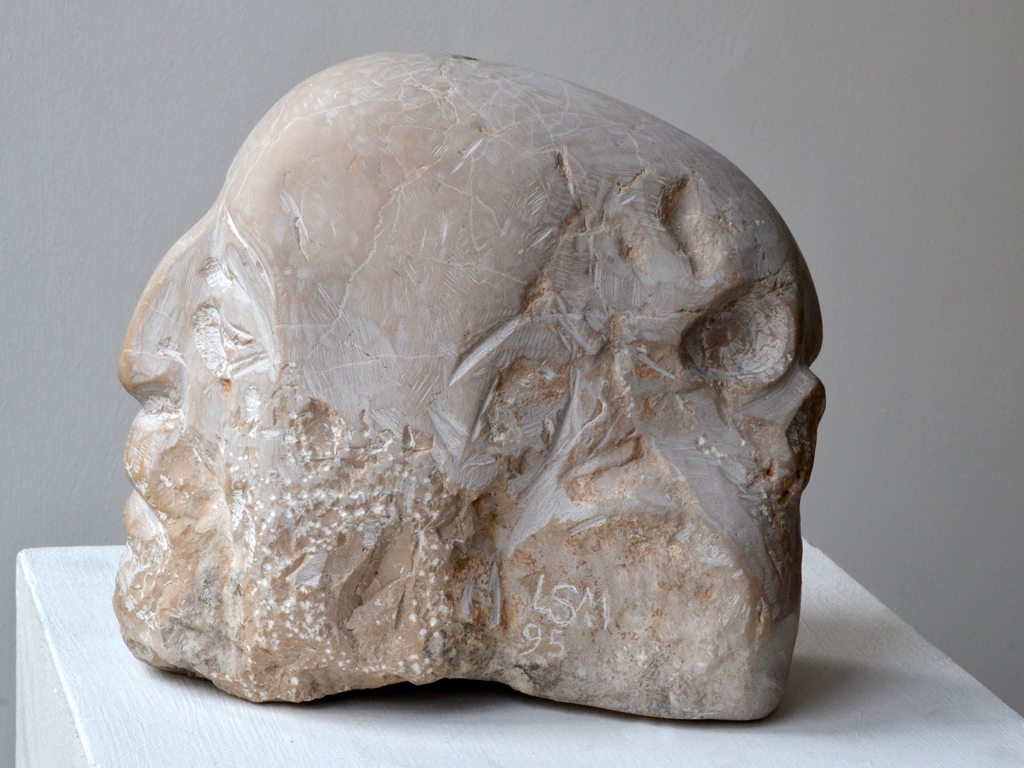
Memento mori, limestone,1995

=== Realizations ===
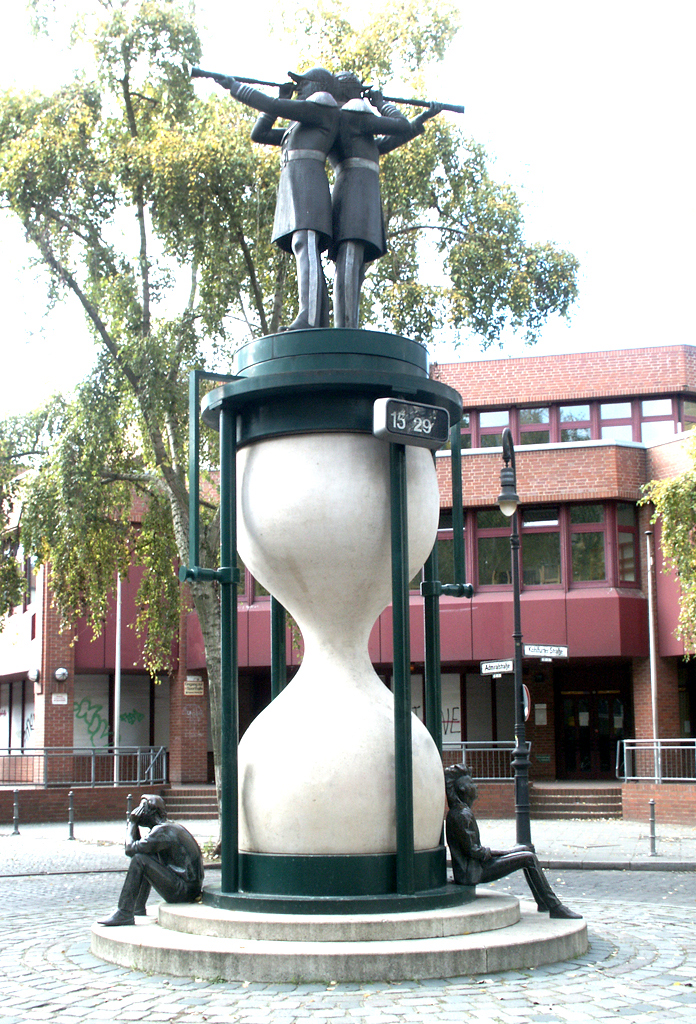
Double Admiral, 1985, Berlin-Kreuzberg

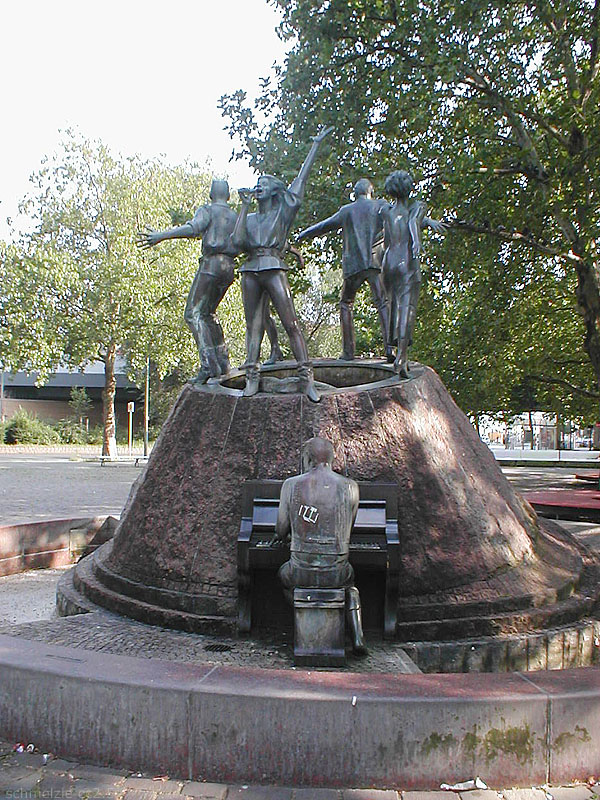
Playing with Fire, 1988, Berlin-Wedding

- 1964 Mouth Organ Player, Mariánské Lázně
- 1984 Justice, Criminal Court Moabit, Berlin
- 1985 Double Admiral, Admiralstraße, Berlin-Kreuzberg
- 1985 Ernst Heilmann, memorial Plaque for victims of Fascism, Berlin-Kreuzberg
- 1987 Four Seasons, relief for primary school, Berlin-Kreuzberg
- 1988 Carl von Ossietzky, memorial, Berlin-Kreuzberg
- 1988 Playing with Fire, fountain Berlin-Wedding
- 1988 Police Machine, Police Berlin-Spandau
- 1989 Fountain Head, Job Centre Kiel
- 1991 Relief for Fire Station, Berlin-Zehlendorf
- 1993 Theodor Lessing, memorial plaque, Mariánské Lázně
- 1993 Prayer, Malcesine
- 2002 Archangel Michael, relief for Chapel St. Michael, Malcesine

=== Collections ===
- Berlinische Gallery, Berlin
- Communal Gallery Berlin
- Nicolas Treadwell Gallery, London

=== Solo exhibitions ===
- 1964-1968 Mariánské Lázně
- 1981 Artist of the Month, Communal Gallery, Berlin
- 1987 House at Lützowplatz, Berlin
- 1989 Municipal Gallery, Castle Oberhausen, (with Sarah Haffner, Maina M. Musky)
- 1992 Heritage and Future, City Hall Brno
- 1992 Heritage and Future, Mánes, Prague
- 1992 Heritage and Future Kolonady Mariánské Lázně
- 1996 Palazzo dei Capitani, Malcesine
- 1998 Gallery Rutzmoser, Munich
- 1998 Between Two Worlds, Communal Gallery, Berlin
- 2000 Gallery Aeras, Herrenhut, Culture Centre Čáslav, Small Theater Liberec
- 2001 Theaterei in Castle Erbach
- 2001 Anglican Chapel Mariánské Lázně
- 2002 Gallery Rutzmoser, Munich, Třebíč Castle
- 2003 Palacky University, Olomouc
- 2004 Slovakian Museum, Uherské Hradiště
- 2005 Diocese Museum Plzeň
- 2005 Sculptures and Drawings, Ludmila Seefried-Matejkova, Sculpture Forum, Isernhagen
- 2007 Pictures of People- Sculptures and Drawings, Berlin-Tempelhof
- 2011 Between Two Worlds, (with Zuzana Richter, Photography), Czech Centre, Prague
- 2013 On the Fringe, Topičův salon Prague

=== Group exhibitions ===
- 1973 exhibition of students of the HfBK, House at Kleinspark, Berlin
- 1973 Annual exhibition of German Artists Association, Berlin
- 1974 Annual exhibition of German Artist association, Mainz
- 1976 Pictures of People, Schwetzingen and Cochen
- 1977 International Female Artists 1877-1977
- 1978 The Seventies meet the Twenties – Ugly Realism, London
- 1980 New Darmstadt Secession, Darmstadt
- 1981 Great Art Exhibition Munich, House of Arts, Munich
- 1983 Sculptors Symposium St. Margareten Burgenland, Austria
- 1984 Women's Art at Womenswold, Nicholas Treadwell Gallery, Denne Hill, Kent
- 1986 Tod und Leben, Obere Galerie – Haus am Lützowplatz, Berlin, with Waldemar Grzimek, Carl Hofer, Käthe Kollwitz, Alfred Kubin, Heinrich Richter-Berlin, Georges Rouault, Ingo Kühl among others 1986.
- 1988 Berlin Female Artists, Narni, Italy
- 1988 Berlin Artists, City Hall Odense, Danmark
- 1993 Realism Triennial, Martin-Gropius-Bau, Berlin
- 1994 7 Berlin Realists, Wendhausen Castle
- 1997 I am a Berliner, Mathew's Church, Berlin
- 1999 Gallery at Potsdamer Platz, Autumn Salon, Paris
- 2001–2004 Artists Sonderbund in Germany, Communal Gallery Berlin
- 2002–2003 United Buddy Bears at Pariser Platz, Berlin
- 2005–2012 Position of artists from the Darmstadt Secession, Graz
- 2006–2007 Dialogue of the Generations, Berlin Communal Gallery, Diamond Gallery, Prague
- 2008 Realism from 1968-2008, Sculpture Forum Isernhagen
- 2009 Czech Art Yesterday and Today, (Otto Gutfreund, Ludmila Seefried-Matějková, Rudolf Valenta, Zuzana Richter), Berlin
- 2010 20 Years Artists, Sonderbund in Germany, Berlin-Wedding
- 2011–2014 North Art, Kunstwerk Carlshütte, Büdelsdorf

== Bibliography ==
- Realismus. 45 Jahre Deutsche Bildhauerei, 2014, Karina Türr, Michael Imhof Verlag, Petersberg
- Ludmila Seefried-Matějková, Na pokraji/On the Edge, 2013, cat., Topičův salon, Prague
- Ludmila Seefried-Matejková, Zwischen zwei Welten, 1998, Udo Christoffel, Rainer Höynck, cat., Kommunale Galerie, Berlin
- Ludmila Seefried-Matejková, 1992, Stefanie Endlich, Anděla Horová, cat. 54 pp., Dům umění města Brna, ISBN 80-7009-044-8
- Ludmila Seefried-Matejková, Rauscher, 1985, Stefanie Endlich, 72 pp.
- Sex Female, the art of contemporary occupation artist, 1984, Denne Hill, Nicholas Treadwell publications, Womensworld Kent
- Ludmila Seefried-Matějková, 1981, edition: Künstler der Monats, Kommunale Galerie, Berlin, 16 pp.
