= Kněžice (Jihlava District) =

- Municipality
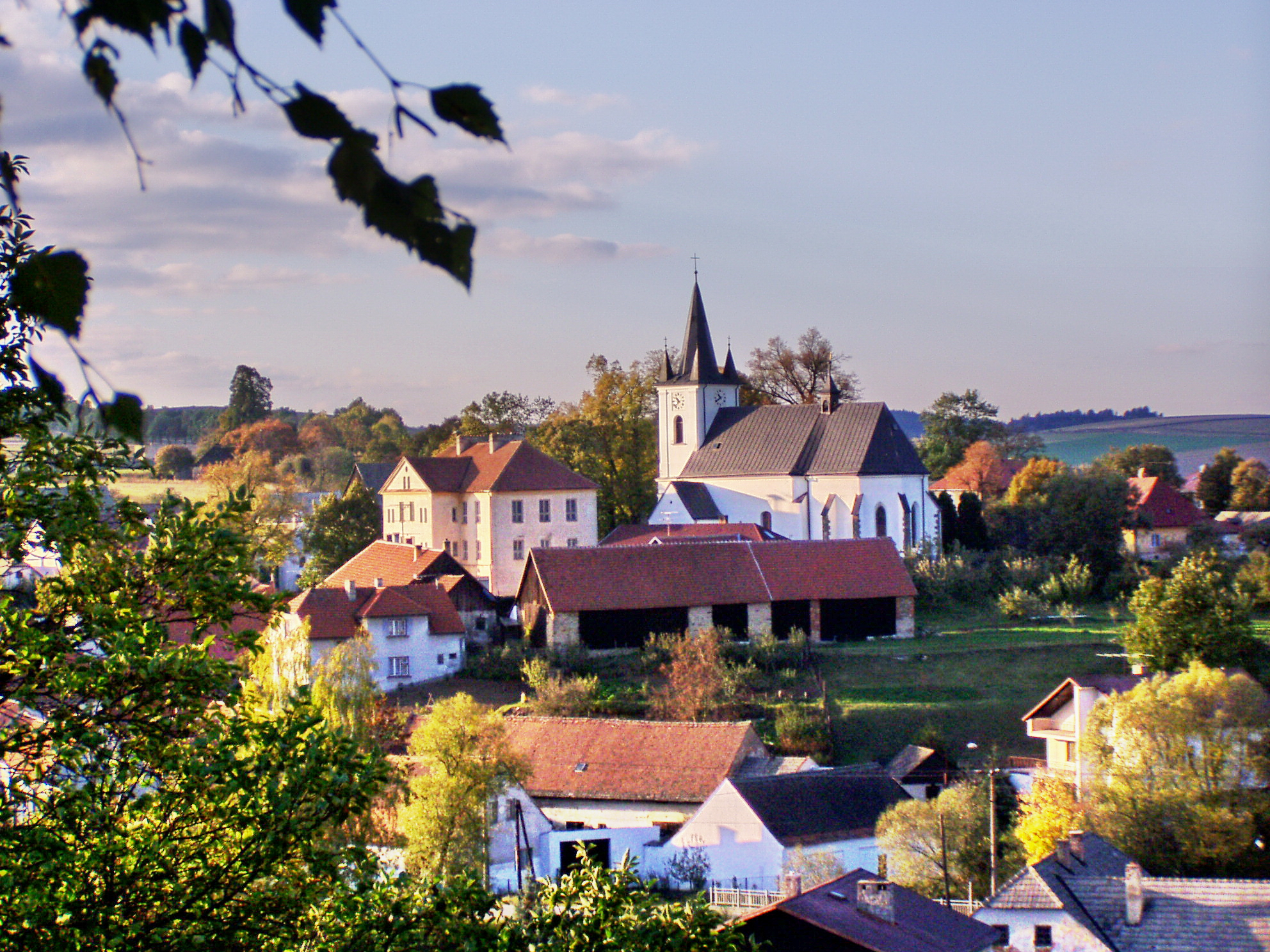
- Church of Saint James the Great

- Flag Coat of arms

- Location in the Czech Republic
- Coordinates: 49°16′15″N 15°40′20″E
- Country: Czech Republic
- Region: Vysočina
- District: Jihlava
- First mentioned: 1222

Area
  - Total: 22.39 km^{2} (8.64 sq mi)
- Elevation: 550 m (1,800 ft)

Population (2026-01-01)
  - Total: 1,386
  - Density: 61.90/km^{2} (160.3/sq mi)
- Time zone: UTC+1 (CET)
  - Summer (DST): UTC+2 (CEST)
- Postal code: 675 29
- Website: www.knezice.com

Kněžice (Czech pronunciation: [ˈkɲɛʒɪtsɛ]) is a municipality and village in Jihlava District in the Vysočina Region of the Czech Republic. It has about 1,400 inhabitants.

== Administrative division ==
Kněžice consists of four municipal parts (in brackets population according to the 2021 census):

- Kněžice (1,082)
- Brodce (132)
- Rychlov (15)
- Víska (92)

== Geography ==
Kněžice is located about 15 kilometres (9 mi) southeast of Jihlava. It lies in the Křižanov Highlands. The highest point is at 669 m (2,195 ft) above sea level. The Brtnice River flows through the municipality. The fishponds Kněžický rybník and Strážov are built here on the river. The municipality of Hrutov forms an enclave in the municipal territory of Kněžice.

== History ==
The first written mention of Kněžice is from 1222. Until the end of the 16th century, half of Kněžice and the villages of Rychlov and Víska were owned by the monastery in Želiv. The second half of Kněžice was property of various noble families, most notably of the Waldstein family in the early 17th century. In the 1620s, Kněžice was acquired by the Collalto family, who held it continuously until the establishment of an independent municipality.

== Demographics ==
Historical population

Year	Pop.	±%
1869	1,537	—
1880	1,587	+3.3%
1890	1,517	−4.4%
1900	1,423	−6.2%
1910	1,354	−4.8%

Year	Pop.	±%
1921	1,372	+1.3%
1930	1,232	−10.2%
1950	1,174	−4.7%
1961	1,273	+8.4%
1970	1,244	−2.3%

Year	Pop.	±%
1980	1,314	+5.6%
1991	1,398	+6.4%
2001	1,420	+1.6%
2011	1,410	−0.7%
2021	1,321	−6.3%

Source: Censuses

== Transport ==
There are no railways or major roads passing through the municipality.

== Sights ==
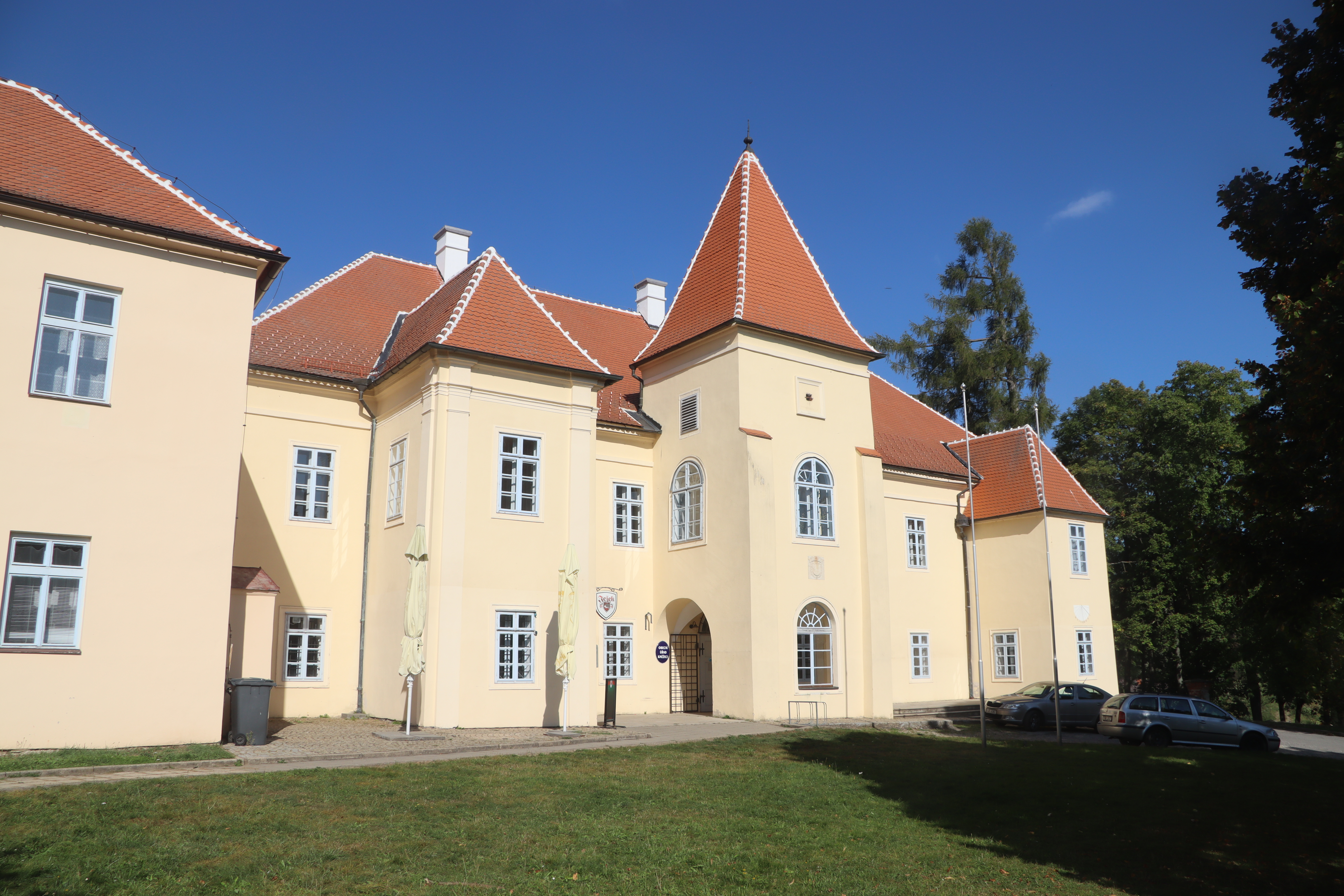
Kněžice Castle

The Church of Saint James the Great has a Romanesque core. In the second half of the 14th century, it was rebuilt in the Gothic style and extended. The tower was added only in 1838.

Kněžice Castle is a Renaissance hunting lodge with Baroque and Neoclassical modifications. It was built at the end of the 16th century on the site on an old fortress. Today the castle houses the municipal office, a library and Kněžice's Museum of Nature.

== Notable people ==
- Jaroslav Kožešník (1907–1985), scientist and politician
