= Lomonosov Gold Medal =

Annual Russian natural sciences and humanities award

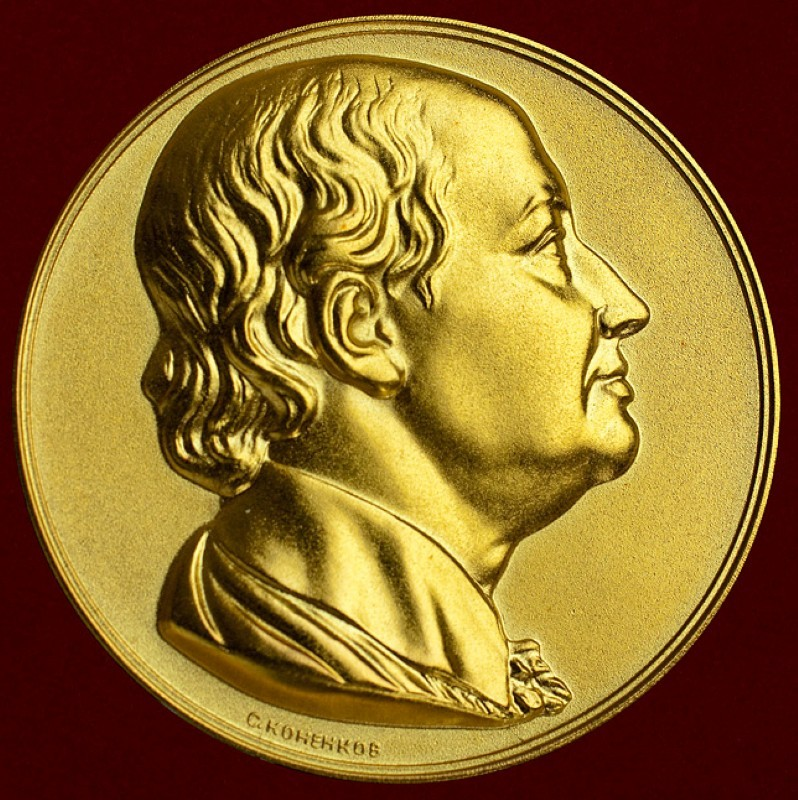
- Country: Soviet Union / Russia
- Presented by: Russian Academy of Sciences
- Rewards: A gold medal, a diploma,
- First award: 1959; 67 years ago
- Number of laureates: 106 prizes to 54 laureates (as of 2019)
- Website: http://www.ras.ru/about/awards/lomonosovgoldmedal.aspx

The Lomonosov Gold Medal (Russian: Большая золотая медаль имени М. В. Ломоносова Bol'shaya zolotaya medal' imeni M. V. Lomonosova), named after Russian scientist and polymath Mikhail Lomonosov, is awarded each year since 1959 for outstanding achievements in the natural sciences and the humanities by the USSR Academy of Sciences and later the Russian Academy of Sciences (RAS). Since 1967, two medals have been awarded annually: one to a Russian and one to a foreign scientist. It is the academy's highest accolade.

== Recipients of Lomonosov Gold Medal ==
=== 1959 ===
- Pyotr Leonidovich Kapitsa: cumulatively, for works in physics of low temperatures.

=== 1961 ===
- Aleksandr Nikolaevich Nesmeyanov: accumulatively for works in chemistry.

=== 1963 ===
- Sin-Itiro Tomonaga (member of the Japanese academy of Sciences, president of the Scientific Council of Japan): for substantial scientific contributions to the development of physics.
- Hideki Yukawa (member of the Japanese academy of Sciences, director of the Institute of Basic Research at the University of Kyoto): for outstanding merits in the development of theoretical physics.

=== 1964 ===
- Sir Howard Walter Florey (professor, president of the Royal Society of Great Britain): for an outstanding contribution in the development of medicine.

=== 1965 ===
- Nikolai Vasilevich Belov: accumulatively for works in crystallography.

=== 1967 ===
- Igor Yevgenyevich Tamm: for outstanding achievements in the theory of elementary particles and other domain of theoretical physics
- Cecil Frank Powell (professor, member of the Royal Society of Great Britain): for outstanding achievements in the physics of elementary particles.

=== 1968 ===
- Vladimir Aleksandrovich Engelgardt: for outstanding achievements in biochemistry and molecular biology.
- István Rusznyák (president of the Academy of Sciences of the Hungarian People's Republics): for outstanding achievements in medicine.

=== 1969 ===
- Nikolay Nikolaevich Semenov: for outstanding achievements in chemical physics.
- Giulio Natta (professor, Italy): for outstanding achievements in the chemistry of polymers

=== 1970 ===
- Ivan Matveevich Vinogradov: for outstanding studies in mathematics.
- Arnaud Denjoy (member of the Académie française): for outstanding achievements in mathematics.

=== 1971 ===
- Viktor Amazaspovich Ambartsumian: for outstanding achievements in astronomy and astrophysics.
- Hannes Alfvén (professor, member of the Royal Academy of Sciences in Stockholm, Sweden): for outstanding achievements in physics of plasma and astrophysics.

=== 1972 ===
- Nikoloz Muskhelishvili: for outstanding achievements in mathematics and mechanics.
- Max Steenbeck (full member of the Academy of Sciences of the German Democratic Republic): for outstanding achievements in the physics of plasma and applied physics.

=== 1973 ===
- Aleksandr Pavlovich Vinogradov: for outstanding achievements in geochemistry.
- Vladimír Zoubek (full member of the Czechoslovak Academy of Sciences): for outstanding achievements in geology.

=== 1974 ===
- Aleksandr Ivanovich Tselikov: for outstanding achievements in metallurgy and metal technology.
- Angel Balevski (full member of the Bulgarian Academy of Sciences): for outstanding achievements in metallurgy and metal technology.

=== 1975 ===
- Mstislav Vsevolodovich Keldysh: for outstanding achievements in mathematics, mechanics and space research.
- Maurice Roy (full member of the Académie française): for outstanding achievements in mechanics and its applications.

=== 1976 ===
- Semyon Isaakovich Volfkovich: for outstanding achievements in chemistry and the technology of phosphorus and the development of scientific foundations of chemicalization of agriculture in the USSR.
- Herman Klare (full member of the Academy of Sciences of the German Democratic Republic): for outstanding achievements in the chemistry and technology of man-made fibers.

=== 1977 ===
- Mikhail Alekseevich Lavrentiev: for outstanding achievements in mathematics and mechanics.
- Linus Carl Pauling (member of the US National Academy of Sciences): for outstanding achievements in chemistry and biochemistry.

=== 1978 ===
- Anatolii Petrovich Aleksandrov: for outstanding achievements in nuclear science and technology.
- Alexander Robertus Todd (professor, president of the Royal Society of Great Britain): for outstanding achievements in organic chemistry.

=== 1979 ===
- Aleksandr Ivanovich Oparin: for outstanding achievements in biochemistry.
- Béla Szőkefalvi-Nagy (full member of the Hungarian Academy of Sciences): for outstanding achievements in mathematics.

=== 1980 ===
- Boris Yevgenevich Paton: for outstanding achievements in metallurgy and metal technology.
- Jaroslav Kožešník (full member of the Czechoslovak Academy of Sciences): for outstanding achievements in applied mathematics and mechanics.

=== 1981 ===
- Vladimir Aleksandrovich Kotelnikov: for outstanding achievements in radiophysics, radio engineering and electronics.
- Pavle Savić (full member of the Serbian Academy of Sciences and Arts, Socialist Federative Republic of Yugoslavia): for outstanding achievements in chemistry and physics.

=== 1982 ===
- Julii Borisovich Khariton: for outstanding achievements in physics.
- Dorothy Crowfoot Hodgkin (professor, member of the London Royal Society): for outstanding achievements in biochemistry and crystal chemistry.

=== 1983 ===
- Andrei Lvovich Kursanov: for outstanding achievements in physiology and biochemistry of plants.
- Abdus Salam (professor, Pakistan): for outstanding achievements in physics.

=== 1984 ===
- Nikolai Nikolaevich Bogolyubov: for outstanding achievements in mathematics and theoretical physics.
- Rudolf Mössbauer (professor, Federal Republic of Germany): for outstanding achievements in physics.

=== 1985 ===
- Mikhail Aleksandrovich Sadovsky (Soviet academician): for outstanding achievements in geology and geophysics.
- Guillermo Haro (professor, Mexico): for outstanding achievements in astrophysics.

=== 1986 ===
- Svyatoslav Nikolaevich Fyodorov: for outstanding achievements in ophthalmology and eye microsurgery.
- Josef Říman (academician, Chairman of the Czechoslovak Academy of Sciences): for outstanding achievements in biochemistry.

=== 1987 ===
- Aleksandr Mikhailovich Prokhorov: for outstanding achievements in physics.
- John Bardeen (professor, United States): for outstanding achievements in physics.

=== 1988 ===
- Sergei Lvovich Sobolev (posthumously): for outstanding achievements in mathematics.
- Jean Leray (professor, France): for outstanding achievements in mathematics.

=== 1989 ===
- Nikolai Gennadievich Basov: for outstanding achievements in physics.
- Hans Bethe (professor, United States): for outstanding achievements in physics.

=== 1993 ===
- Dmitri Sergeevich Likhachev: for outstanding achievements in the humanities.
- John Kenneth Galbraith (professor, United States): for outstanding achievements in economic and social sciences.

=== 1994 ===
- Nikolai Konstantinovich Kochetkov: for outstanding achievements in the chemistry of carbohydrates and organic synthesis.
- James D. Watson (professor, United States): for outstanding achievements in molecular biology.

=== 1995 ===
- Vitaly Lazarevich Ginzburg: for outstanding achievements in theoretical physics and astrophysics.
- Anatole Abragam (professor, France): for outstanding achievements in physics of condensed state and methods of research in nuclear physics.

=== 1996 ===
- Nikolai Nikolaevich Krasovsky: for outstanding achievements in the mathematical theory of control and the theory of differential games.
- Friedrich Hirzebruch (professor, Federal Republic of Germany): for outstanding achievements in algebraic geometry and algebraic topology.

=== 1997 ===
- Boris Sergeyevich Sokolov: for outstanding achievements in the studies of the early biosphere of the Earth, the discovery of the ancient Wend geological system and classical works in fossil corals.
- Frank Press (professor, United States): for outstanding achievements in the physics of solid Earth.

=== 1998 ===
- Aleksandr Solzhenitsyn: for an outstanding contribution into the development of Russian literature, Russian language and Russian history.
- Yosikazu Nakamura (professor, Japan): for an outstanding contribution to the study of Slavistics and the popularization of Russian literature and culture in Japan.

=== 1999 ===
- Valentin Lavrentevich Yanin: for achievements in the archaeological studies of medieval Russia.
- Michael Müller-Wille (professor, Germany): for achievements in the study of foreign relations of early medieval Russia.

=== 2000 ===
- Andrei Viktorovich Gaponov-Grekhov: for fundamental works in the fields of electrodynamics, plasma physics and physical electronics.
- Charles Hard Townes (professor, United States): for fundamental works in quantum electronics leading to the development of the maser and laser.

=== 2001 ===
- Alexander Sergeevich Spirin: for achievements in the study of the structure of nucleic acids and the functions of ribosomes.
- Alexander Rich (professor, United States): for achievements in the study of the structure of nucleic acids and the functions of ribosomes.

=== 2002 ===
- Olga Aleksandrovna Ladyzhenskaya: for outstanding achievements in mathematics.
- Lennart Carleson (professor, Sweden): for outstanding achievements in mathematics.

=== 2003 ===
- Evgeny Chazov: for outstanding achievements in cardiology.
- Michael E. DeBakey (professor, United States): for outstanding achievements in cardiology.

=== 2004 ===
- Gury Ivanovich Marchuk: for his outstanding contribution to the creation of new models and methods of solving problems of nuclear-reactor physics, atmosphere and ocean physics.
- Edward N. Lorenz (professor, United States): for major achievements in developing the theory of general circulation of the atmosphere and the theory of chaotic attractors of dissipative systems.

=== 2005 ===
- Yuri Andreevich Ossipyan: for outstanding achievements in solid state physics.
- Peter Hirsch (professor, Great Britain): for outstanding achievements in solid state physics.

=== 2006 ===
- Nikolay Pavlovich Laverov: for outstanding achievements in geology and geophysics.
- Rodney Charles Ewing (professor, United States): for his research on the nuclear fuel cycle and nuclear waste management.

=== 2007 ===
- Andrey Anatolyevich Zaliznyak: for outstanding achievements in research in linguistics.
- Simon Franklin (professor, Great Britain): for outstanding achievements in research in Russian history and culture.

=== 2008 ===
- Evgenii Maksimovich Primakov: for outstanding contributions in the development of the social sciences.
- Hélène Carrère d’Encausse (professor, France): for outstanding achievements in research of political and social processes in soviet and postsoviet periods of Russia.

=== 2009 ===
- Vadim Tikhonovich Ivanov: for outstanding contributions in the development of bioorganic chemistry.
- Ryōji Noyori (professor, Japan): for outstanding contributions in the development of organic chemistry and catalytic asymmetric synthesis.

=== 2010 ===
- Spartak Timofeevich Belyaev: for outstanding contributions in physics.
- Gerard 't Hooft (professor, Netherlands): for outstanding contributions in physics.

=== 2011 ===
- Vladimir Alexandrovich Tartakovsky: for outstanding contributions in chemistry.
- Roald Hoffmann (professor, United States): for outstanding contributions in chemistry.

=== 2012 ===
- Gleb Vsevolodovich Dobrovolsky: for outstanding contribution in the field of soil science.
- Richard Warren Arnold (professor, United States): for his outstanding contribution to the development of theoretical and applied soil science and modeling the behavior of soils in different landscapes of the world.

=== 2013 ===
- Ludvig Dmitrievich Faddeev: for outstanding contribution to quantum field theory and the theory of elementary particles.
- Peter David Lax (professor, United States): for outstanding contribution to the theory of hydrodynamic solitons.

=== 2014 ===
- Anatoly Derevyanko: for his outstanding contribution to the development of a new fundamental scientific concept formation of modern human physical type and its culture.
- Svante Pääbo (professor, Sweden): for outstanding achievements in the field of archeology and paleogenetics.

=== 2015 ===
- Leonid Veniaminovich Keldysh: for outstanding contributions to the physics of tunnel phenomena, including the tunnel effects in semiconductors.
- Paul Corkum (professor, Canada): for outstanding contribution in ultrafast physics, including attosecond range, and interferometry processes of electron wave functions in atoms and molecules with unprecedented spatial and temporal resolution.

=== 2016 ===
- Dmitrii Knorre: for his outstanding contribution in the field of nucleic acid chemistry, affinity modification of biopolymers, becoming the most important areas of pharmacology - therapeutic nucleic acids and the development of gene therapy techniques.
- Sidney Altman (Canada and United States): for his outstanding contribution in the field of biochemistry of nucleic acids, the discovery of the catalytic activity of the nucleic acids and the creation of new biologically active substances.

=== 2017 ===
- Yuri Tsolakovich Oganesyan: for fundamental research in the field of interaction of complex nuclei and experimental confirmation of the hypothesis of the existence of "stability islands" of superheavy elements.
- Björn Jonson (professor, Sweden): for work of a fundamental nature, which are of fundamental importance for the study of the nuclear structure and nuclear stability of exotic lightest nuclei at the boundaries of nucleon stability.

=== 2018 ===
- Joseph Isaevich Gitelzon: for the justification and development of the ecological direction of biophysics, which has achieved a number of outstanding fundamental and practical results, in particular in marine and laboratory studies of bioluminescence.
- Martin Chalfie (professor, United States): for developing new methods for bioluminescent analysis using GFP luminescent protein.

=== 2019 ===
- Georgy Sergeyevich Golitsyn: for outstanding contribution to the study of the physics of the earth's atmosphere and planets and the development of the theory of climate and its changes.
- Paul Jozef Crutzen (professor, Netherlands): for outstanding contribution to chemistry atmosphere and assessment of the role of biogeochemical cycles in the climate formation.

=== 2020 ===
- Sergey Petrovich Novikov: for a leading role in the revival of modern topology in our country, solving fundamental problems of topology, the theory of nonlinear waves, quantum mechanics and field theory.
- John Willard Milnor (professor, United States): for the discovery of non-standard smooth structures on multidimensional spheres, solving fundamental problems of topology and the theory of dynamical systems.

=== 2021 ===
- Georgy Pavlovich Georgiev: for classical works on the study of the structure and expression of the genome of higher eukaryotes.
- Richard John Roberts (professor, Great Britain): for his great contribution to the study of pro- and eukaryotic genomes, RNA splicing, gene identification restriction enzymes and methylases.

=== 2022 ===
- Yuri Victorovich Natochin for studying the mechanism of water-salt metabolism in astronauts and ways to normalize it in stroke.
- Denis Noble for developing a mathematical model of the electrical phenomena of the heart.

== See also ==
- List of general science and technology awards
- Prizes named after people
