= Václav Dobruský =

Archaeologist

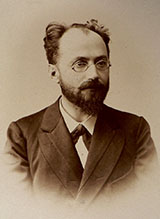
Václav Dobruský

Václav Dobruský (Bulgarian: Вацлав Добруски, Vatslav Dobruski; 11 August 1858 – 24 December 1916) was a Czech archaeologist, epigrapher and numismatist who was mostly active in Bulgaria. The first director of the National Archaeological Museum of Bulgaria from 1893 to 1910, he is regarded as one of the founding fathers of archaeology in that country.

== Biography ==
Dobruský was born in the small eastern Bohemian town of Heřmanův Městec (Hermannstädtel), then in eastern Bohemia, Austrian Empire (today in Pardubice Region, Czech Republic). He graduated from the Faculty of Philosophy at Charles University in Prague, where he studied Ancient Greek and Latin. Upon his graduation, he was invited to newly liberated Eastern Rumelia to work as a teacher. From 1880 to 1886, he taught Latin at the high school in Plovdiv, the capital of Eastern Rumelia. It was during this time that he began his research on the archaeology of Thrace and medieval Bulgarian epigraphy.

A year after the Bulgarian unification in 1885, Václav Dobruský moved to Sofia, the capital of the Principality of Bulgaria. Between 1886 and 1893, he was teacher of Latin at the Sofia High School for Boys. From 1890 to 1910, he read lectures on ancient archaeology at what is today Sofia University. In 1893, he was appointed director of the newly established National Archaeological Museum and organized the museum's first exhibitions based on the Prague and Vienna museums.

As an archaeologist, Dobruský personally headed the excavations of the Zlatna Panega asclepieion in 1903–1906, the Ognyanovo nymphaeum in 1904 and the ancient cities of Oescus (1904–1905) and Nicopolis ad Istrum (1906–1909). These and other discoveries increased the National Archaeological Museum's collection from the initial 343 items and 2,357 coins to 5,504 items and 16,135 coins by 1 February 1910, when Dobruský retired as director of the museum to be replaced by Bogdan Filov. In 1907, Dobruský had laid the foundations of Bulgarian archaeology periodicals with his journals on the archaeological museum's findings. He authored over 50 articles on ancient archaeology, epigraphy and history.

In 1911, Dobruský returned to Prague. From 1912 to 1914, he taught Latin and Greek numismatics at Charles University. From 1916 to his death, he headed the library of the Royal Czech Society of Sciences.
