= Herman Klare =

German chemist

Hermann Klare
- Born: May 12, 1909; Hamelin, Lower Saxony
- Died: August 22, 2003 (aged 94); Dresden, Saxony
- Awards: Lomonosov Gold Medal (1976)

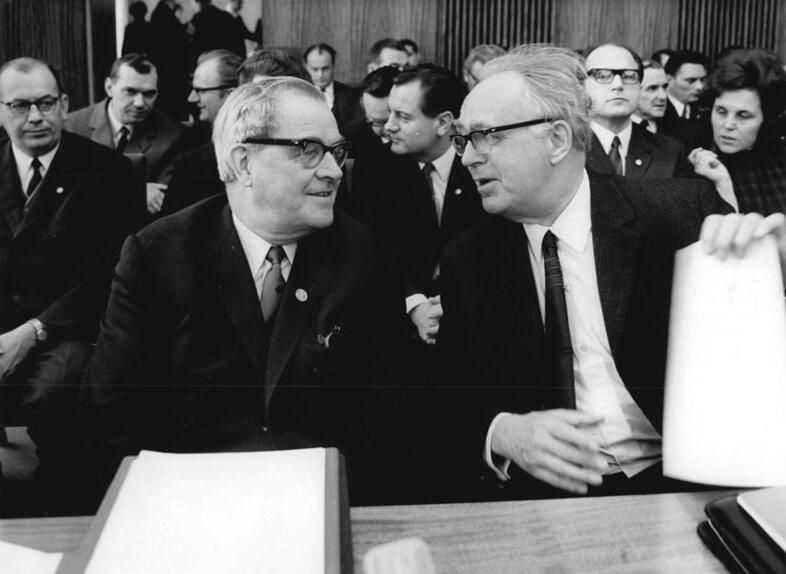
Hermann Klare (left) with Max Steenbeck

Hermann Klare (12 May 1909 – 22 August 2003) was a chemistry academic who played a prominent role in scientific administration and research in the German Democratic Republic (GDR). Klare held professorships at the Technical University Leuna-Merseburg and at Humboldt University (Berlin). From 1968 to 1979 he was president of the German Academy of Sciences (renamed the Academy of Sciences of the GDR in 1972).

== Publications ==
- Technology and chemistry of synthetic polyamide fibers. Berlin 1954
- Synthetic polyamide fibers: technology and chemistry. Berlin 1963 (as co-author)
- The Academy of Sciences of the GDR: the 275th anniversary of the founding of the Academy. Berlin 1975
- History of chemical fiber research to the present. Berlin 1985
