= Semyon Volfkovich =

Soviet chemist, technologist, and academician

Semyon Isaakovich Volfkovich (Russian: Семён Исаакович Вольфкович) (October 23, 1896 – November 12, 1980) was an outstanding Soviet chemist, inorganic chemist, technologist, Doctor of Chemical Sciences (1934), member of the Academy of Sciences of the Soviet Union (since 1946). He was engaged in the technology of production of mineral fertilizers, studied the processes of electrothermal sublimation of phosphorus. He developed an industrial scheme for producing potassium salts from sylvinite and a new technology for producing concentrated phosphate fertilizers. He was the first in the USSR to conduct research on fluoride gases utilization, to study the processes of processing mirabilite into soda and ammonium sulfate. He studied the catalytic and other properties of aluminum-, boron-, iron-phosphates.

== Biography ==
Semyon Isaakovich Volfkovich was born in 1896 in the city of Ananyev, former Kherson province (now Odessa region, Ukraine). His father was a pharmacist (died in 1919), his mother was a housewife.

In the early years of his life he studied at a real school at the Lutheran Church. St. Michael (graduated in 1913). Despite excellent grades, because of his Jewish origin, he could not immediately enter the higher school he wanted, and for two years he attended the People's University of A. L. Shanyavsky. In 1915 he was enrolled in the technical faculty of the Moscow Institute of National Economy (MINE). Simultaneously with his studies, he served in the military and studied at the chemistry department of the Moscow Higher Technical School, specializing in mineral substances. The scientist was forced to constantly look for ways to earn a living, so starting from 1915 to 1916 he worked as a draftsman and trainee turner at the factories of the Dangauer, Kaiser joint-stock company and the Dukovsky and Co. joint-stock company. In 1916–1917 he served in the transport and automobile department of the ZIGS, in 1918–1921. — in the workshops of the Occupational Safety and Health Museum as a draftsman and workshop manager.

In 1920, he defended his dissertation on the topic "Production of enriched superphosphate", received the title of industrial engineer and remained at the institute as a teacher. From this moment the work of a scientist in the chemical specialty begins. In 1920-1922 worked at the Tsaritsyn experimental plant ("Khimsonova", Moscow region) as an engineer. In 1921, he began working at the Institute of Fertilizers of the Supreme Soviet of the National Economy as an engineer, where he subsequently held the positions of head of the laboratory, head of the technological department, chief engineer and deputy director of the institute for scientific work.

As an associate professor, already in 1926 Volfkovich began to teach an independent course on the technology of mineral substances and industry and fertilizer technology at the Plekhanov Institute. In 1929, the NKP was approved as a professor in the Department of Technology of Mineral Substances. From 1930 he worked as a professor at Moscow Higher Technical University, and two years later he became head of the department of general technology. Taught courses at the Marshal Semyon Timoshenko NBC Protection Military Academy, was a teacher at the first courses in the USSR for red directors. While working at the National Research University, Volfkovich carried out scientific and organizational work on the creation of numerous laboratories, semi-factory installations, and personnel training.

In 1939 he was elected a corresponding member of the USSR Academy of Sciences in the Department of Mathematical and Natural Sciences (chemical sciences), and took the position of deputy academician-secretary of the Department of Chemical Sciences of the USSR Academy of Sciences (1939–1953).

In 1940, S. I. Volfkovich was appointed by the Council of People's Commissars of the Soviet Union as a member of the Council of Scientific and Technical Expertise of the Gosplan, and in 1941 as a member of the Scientific and Technical Council under the Commissioner of the State Defense Committee, where he led one of the sections during the Great Patriotic War. Since 1945, he was chairman of the chemical section of the Council of Scientific and Technical Expertise and a member of the Technical Council of the People's Commissariat of the Chemical Industry of the USSR.

After the war of 1941–1945 Volfkovich worked as a professor at M. V. Lomonosov Moscow State University, where he also headed the department of chemical technology.

Died on November 12, 1980, in Moscow.

== Scientific activities and achievements ==
The main scientific activity is related to the field of chemical technology of mineral fertilizers. Volfkovich developed an industrial scheme for producing potassium salts from sylvinite. He actively participated in the creation of the Khibiny Mountains apatite construction and the potash plant in Solikamsk. The scientist led all the work at the National Research University on the study and implementation of apatite in various industries. He was the author of the first monograph in the USSR on the technology of potassium salts. For his work he was elected an honorary Udarnik by the workers of the Potash Plant.

In 1921, together with E.I. Zhukovsky, he conducted experiments on the sublimation of phosphorus in an electric furnace. Based on them, the first factory furnaces were then designed at the Chernorechensky plant. For several years, S.I. Volfkovich led the work on the study of ammophos technology. On the initiative of the scientist, together with A.P. Belopolsky, work was carried out to process mirabilite into soda and ammonium sulfate. In 1932-1933, together with A.F. Vinokurova, the technology for producing boric acid was studied, on the basis of which a scheme for its production was then developed at NIUIF. Volfkovich also devoted part of his research to the study of factory processes for the production of superphosphate, phosphoric acid, phosphorus salts, etc.

Technological work was mainly devoted to two main areas: the study of new ways to produce concentrated fertilizers (ammophos, nitrophos, double and enriched superphosphates, nitrogen-potassium fertilizers) and the integrated use of raw materials and waste (phosphogypsum, sulfur and fluoride gases). More than 40 copyright and patent certificates and applications of the scientist in these areas have been recorded.

Together with other scientists, S. I. Volfkovich studied the processes of sulfite oxidation and the chemistry of decomposition of apatite nepheline ore by acids.

As appointed by the Council of Labor and Defense and the Council of People's Commissars of the Soviet Union, the scientist was a member of several government commissions on the chemicalization of the national economy of the USSR. He was also actively involved in training specialist engineers in the technology of phosphorus, nitrogen and potassium fertilizers.

== Interesting Facts ==
S.I. Volfkovich worked a lot with phosphorus. Phosphorus gas soaked the scientist's clothes, causing them to glow in the dark with a bluish light. When Volfkovich went out into the street at night, a crowd gathered behind him, mistaking him for an otherworldly creature.

== Major works ==
S. I. Volfkovich published in Soviet and foreign journals more than 120 articles and scientific works. In addition to articles and reports, he wrote several textbooks and monographs. Among them:

• “Technical processing of potassium salts” (NNSTU, 1932, 128 p.)

• “Technology of nitrogen fertilizers” (ONTI, 1935, 371 p.)

• “Mineral raw materials of the main chemical industry” (Promizdat, 1926, 104 p.)

• “Processing of Khibiny apatites for fertilizers” (Goskhimtekhizdat, 1932, 64 p.)

• “General chemical technology”, (M.: Higher school, 1953, vol. 1, 632 p. – jointly with others)

• “Hydrothermal processing of phosphates for fertilizers and feed” (M.: Khimiya, 1964, 172 p. - jointly with others.)

• “Problems in the production of mineral fertilizers”, M., 1965

• “Problems of chemistry in agriculture”, M., 1969

In addition, the scientist for several years was the editor of such journals as “Mineral Fertilizers”, “Journal of Chemical Industry”, “Journal of Applied Chemistry”, “Potassium”.

== Award and achievements ==
- Stalin Prize of the second degree (1941) – for the development of a technological process for the integrated use of phosphate raw materials to produce phosphate and nitrogen fertilizers, sodium silicofluoride and rare earths;
- five Orders of Lenin (06.10.1945; March 27, 1954; May 28, 1966; 1971; 1975);
- Order of the Red Banner of Labor (1944);
- Gold medal of the USSR Exhibition of Economic Achievements (1954; 1968);
- Big gold medal of the USSR Exhibition of Economic Achievements (1960; 1964);
- Silver medal of the USSR Exhibition of Economic Achievements (1963);
- Gold medal named after D.I. Mendeleev (1967) "for a series of works on the chemistry of phosphates and the development of processes for producing concentrated and complex fertilizers.";
- Prize of the All-Union Society "Knowledge" (1970);
- Badge "Honorary Chemist" (1974);
- Lomonosov Gold Medal (1976) "for outstanding achievements in the field of chemistry and phosphorus technology, as well as in the development of the scientific foundations for the chemicalization of agriculture in the USSR";
- XXII Mendeleev's reader – March 4, 1968.

== Literature ==
1. Зворыкин А. А. «Биографический словарь деятелей естествознания и техники». М.: Гос. науч. изд-во «Большая Советская Энциклопедия», 1958. — Т. 1 (А—Л). 548 с.
2. Вонский В. А., Кузнецова Г. И. «Выдающиеся химики мира». М.: Высш. шк., 1991. 656 с.
3. Соловьёв Ю. И. «Химики о себе». М.:ВЛАДМО, УМИЦ «ГРАФ-ПРЕСС», 2001. 352 с.
4. Давтян А. О. «Исторические анекдоты». Изд.:ОлмаМедиаГрупп/Просвещение, 2014. 256 с.
5. Прохоров А. М. «Большая советская энциклопедия» М.: Советская энциклопедия, 1969—1978, в 30 т.
6. Московский университет в Великой Отечественной войне [Moscow University in the Great Patriotic War] (4th, revised and expanded ed.). Moscow: Moscow University Publishing House. 2020. ISBN 978-5-19-011499-7.
