= Valery Shibaev =

Professor

Valery Petrovich Shibaev
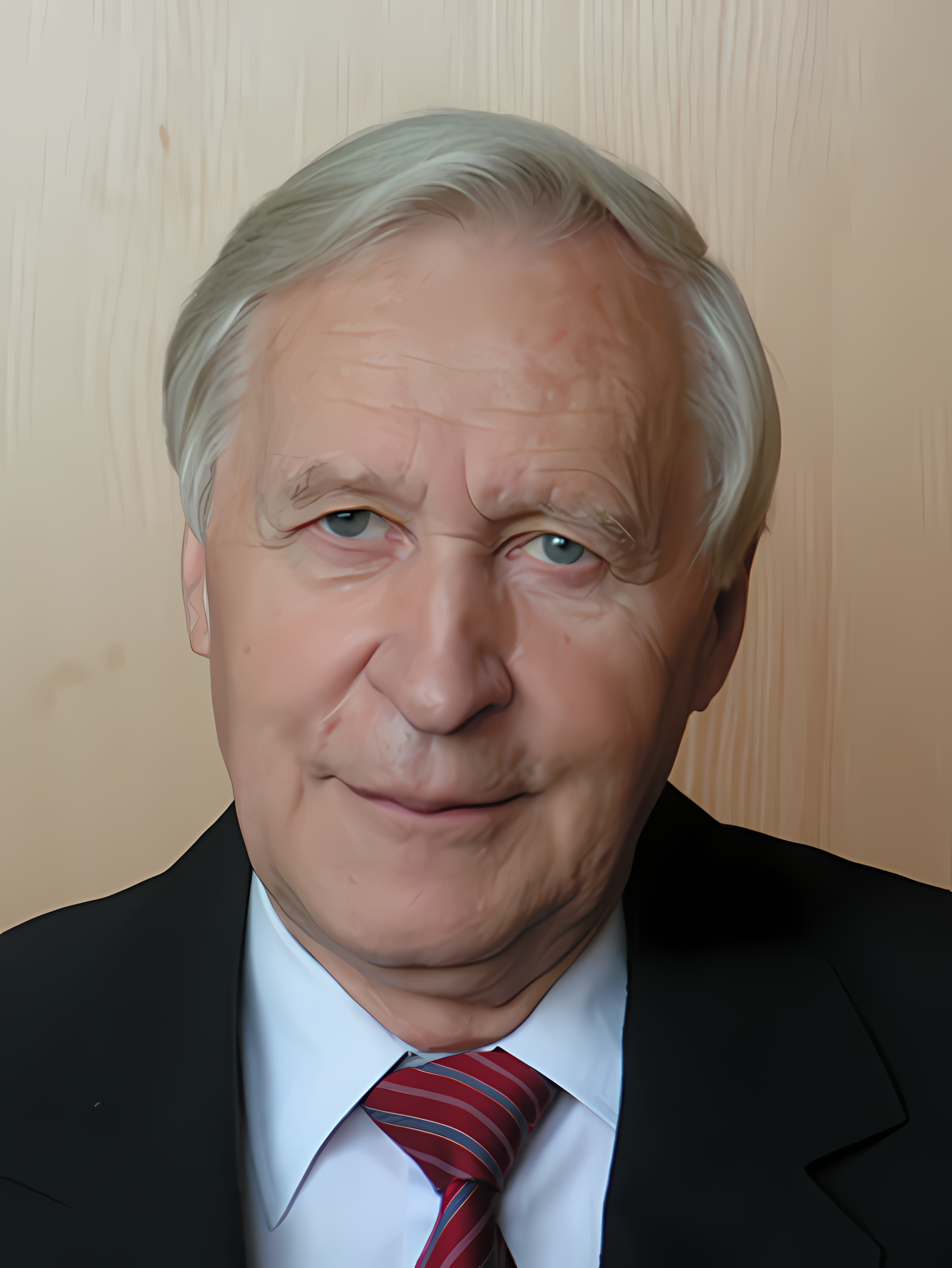
- Born: August 6, 1936; Moscow, Russia
- Education: Moscow State University
- Known for: specialist in the field of physical chemistry of macromolecular compounds
- Awards: Fredericksz Medal (1998), USSR State Prize (1985), Honored Scientist of the Russian Federation (1995)
- Scientific career
- Doctoral advisor: Valentin Kargin, Nikolay Plate

Valery Petrovich Shibaev (born August 6, 1936, Moscow) is a Soviet, Russian chemist and professor at Moscow State University. He is a specialist in the field of physical chemistry of macromolecular compounds and elected member of the Russian Academy of Sciences.

== Biography ==
Born on August 6, 1936, in Moscow. His father, Pyotr Andreevich Shibaev (1902–1961), was a diplomat; his mother was Nina Sergeevna Shibaeva (1904–1987), née Orlova.

In 1944, he enrolled in school 310 in Moscow, graduating in 1954 with a gold medal, and enrolled that same year at the Department of Chemistry of Moscow State University. After graduating from the university in 1959, Shibaev was hired at the Division of Polymer Science, where he went from a junior researcher to a professor. He was a student of academicians V. A. Kargin and N. A. Plate. In 1963, he defended his thesis "Structure formation in graft copolymers" (supervisors: Academician of the Russian Academy of Sciences V. A. Kargin, Corresponding Member of the Russian Academy of Sciences N. A. Plate), in 1974 he defended his doctoral dissertation "The structure and properties of comb-like polymers" (orig. «Структура и свойства гребнеобразных полимеров»).

He underwent postdoctoral training at the University of Padua (Italy) in 1970–71 and at the University of Mainz (Germany) in 1978.

He was awarded a Fulbright scholarship (USA) in macromolecular chemistry for the 1978–1979 program year and worked for three months at Lowell University (now the University of Massachusetts Lowell) as a visiting scholar, giving a lecture series called "Comb-shaped and Liquid Crystalline Polymers" there and at Celanese, Goodyear, Hercules, and IBM companies, as well as at Kent, Akron, and Brooklyn Universities.

A full professor at Moscow State University since 1976, he has trained more than 40 candidates and 7 doctors of science. He has given lecture courses: "Polymer Science", "Chemical transformations of polymers", "Structural-chemical modification of polymers", "Introduction to the specialty", "Liquid crystals and liquid crystalline (LC) polymers".

He has been the head of the Laboratory of Chemical Transformations of Polymers at the Department of Chemistry at Moscow State University since 1985 and was deputy head of the Division of High Molecular Compounds in 1976–2018.

In 1991–93 he gave lecture courses on polymers in Japan, China, and South Korea. In 1997–2002, together with Academician of the Russian Academy of Sciences A. R. Khokhlov, he led the scientific and educational program on polymers and annually gave lectures on macromolecular compounds at the University of Copenhagen (Denmark).

In 1999, he was granted the title Distinguished Professor of Moscow State University. In 2020, he was named by the Ministry of Science and Education as an Honored Professor in Higher Education in the Russian Federation.

== Scientific activities ==
V.P. Shibaev is the author of fundamental scientific works in the field of synthesis, study of the structure and physicochemical properties of high-molecular compounds. He developed a structural-chemical approach to the problems of polymer modification, obtaining block and graft copolymers, halogenated polyhydrocarbons, and also synthesized a wide range of comb-like polymers and copolymers.

Shibaev was "the first to discover the ability of irregular comb-shaped polymers and copolymers toproduce a specific crystalline structure that can be described in terms of the rotational crystalline state".

Shibaev studied the deformation and rheological characteristics of comb-shaped polymers and described their extraordinary and strong structuring effect with respect to several organic solvents, which leads to the formation of thermoreversible gels. Later on, this research served as the basis for the development of highly effective additives, used to suppress the turbulence in hydrodynamic resistance during the transport of hydrocarbons and oils via long-distance pipelines. These studies have been generalized in two monographs in collaboration with N.A. Plate: "Comb-Shaped Polymers and Liquid Crystals" published by Khimia (1980) and its extended version published by Plenum Press (1987).

He and his coworkers were the first to formulate and experimentally verify the principles of molecular design that determine the conditions for the formation of various types of LC phases in comb-shaped polymers, LC dendrimers and ionic copolymers containing mesogenic groups.

Together with his coworkers he synthesized and studied several hundred new chiral, photochromic, photo-, thermally and electrically controlled polymers and developed principles for the production of multifunctional LC copolymers and LC composites. He developed methods for controlling the molecular and supramolecular structure of such polymers using external electric and magnetic fields. He was the first to obtain thermotropic polymer LC cholesterics and LC ferroelectrics, LCD composites with unique optical properties - thin-film spectrozonal filters, polaroids and reflectors for the infrared and visible spectral regions, photo- and electrically controlled coatings and films for orienting liquid crystals, for recording and storing information (electro-optics, display technology, photonics). He developed new types of LC photomechanical actuators based on polymer-stabilized polyethylene films and LC polymer sensors for determining metal ions.

Shibaev and a group of other authors were awarded the USSR State Prize (1985). In 1998 the "Commonwealth" Russian Regional Society on Liquid Crystals awarded him with the Fredericksz Medal for his "outstanding contribution to the chemistry of liquid crystals".

In 1991, he was elected a corresponding member of the Russian Academy of Natural Sciences (RANS); in 2008 he was elected corresponding member of the Russian Academy of Sciences (RAS).

== Scientific and organizational work ==
He has been the chairman of the specialized scientific council for the defense of candidate and doctoral dissertations at the Lomonosov Moscow State University (since 2007). Member of the Scientific Council of the Russian Academy of Sciences on macromolecular compounds; Chair of the Scientific Council of the Faculty of Chemistry at Moscow State University (since 1980), Expert in the Russian Foundation for Basic Research, member of the Bureau of the Russian Scientific Society for Liquid Crystals "Commonwealth" (since 1975). Titular Member (1987-1995), Associate Member (1996-1998) of the Nomenclature Commission for Polymers of the International Union of Pure and Applied Chemistry (IUPAC), Member of the American Chemical Society (since 1999) and the International Society for Liquid Crystals (since 1987).

He has been a member of the editorial boards of periodical scientific publications: "Colloid & Polymer Science" (regional editor, 1998–2018), "Liquid Crystals" (1986-1991, 1998–2001), "Mendeleev Communications" (1986-1991), "Macromolecular Systems - Materials Approach" (since 1996), "Polymer Science" (1990-2005), "Chemical Physics" (1992-2002), "Bulletin of Moscow State University - Chemistry Series)" (since 1980), "Liquid Crystals and Their Practical Use" (since 2003 ), "Nature" (since 2010), "e-Polymer" (since 2011).

== Bibliography ==
He authored over 500 publications, including 5 books and 10 methodological developments. 15 copyright certificates and 4 international patents have been received.

=== Selected scientific works ===
1. N.A. Plate, V.P. Shibaev "Comb-shaped polymers and liquid crystals" / Moscow, Chemistry, 1980
2. N. Plate, V. Shibaev, «Comb-Shaped Polymers and Liquid Crystals» / Plenum Press, New York - London, 1987
3. «Liquid Crystalline and Mesomorphic Polymers» (Eds. V.P.Shibaev and Lui Lam) / Springer Verlag, New York, 1994
4. V.P. Shibaev «Polymers as Electrooptical and Photooptical Active Media» / Springer-Verlag, Berlin-Heidelberg-New-York, 1996
5. V.P. Shibaev, N.A. Plate "Liquid-crystalline polymers" // Macromolecular compounds, series A, 19, 923–975, 1977
6. V.P. Shibaev, N.A. Plate «Thermotropic liquid crystalline polymers with mesogenic side groups» // Advances in Polymer Science, 60/61, 173–252, 1984
7. V.P.Shibaev, S.G.Kostromin, S.A. Ivanov "Photoregulation of the optical properties of comb-shaped polymers with side mesogenic groups and problems of recording information" // Macromolecular compounds, series A, 39, 43–62, 1997
8. V.P. Shibaev, A.Yu. Bobrovsky, N.I. Boyko "Light-controlled multifunctional liquid crystalline polymers" // Macromolecular compounds, series C, 42, 2205–2234, 2000
9. S.A. Ponomarenko, N.I. Boyko, V.P. Shibaev "Liquid crystal dendrimers" // Macromolecular compounds, series C, 43, 1601–1650, 2001
10. V. Shibaev, A. Bobrovsky, N. Boiko, «Photoactive liquid crystalline polymer systems with light-controllable structure and optical properties» // Progress in Polymer Science, 28, 729–836, 2003
11. D.A. Pebalk, E.B. Barmatov, V.P. Shibaev "Liquid-crystalline ionomers - a new class of mesomorphic polymer systems" // Uspekhi Khimii, 74, 610–633, 2005
12. V.P. Shibaev "Liquid-crystalline polymers - past, present and future" // Macromolecular compounds, 51, 1863–1929, 2009
13. V.P. Shibaev, M.G. Ivanov, N.I. Boyko, E.V. Chernikova "New approach to the synthesis of liquid crystalline triblock copolymers with cholesteric structure" // Reports of the Academy of Sciences, 427, 492–494, 2009
14. V.P. Shibaev, N.I. Boiko «Liquid crystalline silicon-containing dendrimers» / in book "Silicon-containing dendritic polymers" (Eds. P.Dvornik, M. Owen), Springer, London, 237–283, 2009 (https://link.springer.com/chapter/10.1007%2F978-1-4020-8174-3_10)
15. V.P. Shibaev. Chapter 1.10: «Liquid Crystalline polymers» / Polymer Science: A Comprehensive reference (Eds. K. Matyjaszewski, M. Moller), Elsevier B.V., 1, 259–285, 2012 (https://dx.doi.org/10.1016/B978-0-444-53349-4.00012-1)
16. V.P. Shibaev "Liquid crystals - centaurs of nature" // Nature, 1, 61–69, 2012
17. V.P. Shibaev "Polymer centaurs" // Nature, 6, 12–24, 2012 (http://www.ras.ru/publishing/nature.aspx)
18. A. Bobrovsky, K. Mochalov, D. Sobolyeva, V. Shibaev, M. Cigl, V. Hamplova, A. Bubnov "Laser-induced formation of "craters" and "hills" in azobenzene-containing polymethacrylate films" // Soft Matter, 16, 5398–5405, 2020
19. M. Bugakov, P. Samokhvalov, V. Shibaev, N. Boiko "Hybrid-fluorescent cholesteric materials with controllable light emission containing quantum dots stabilized by LC copolymers" // Optical Materials Express, 11, 1842–1851, 2021

== Awards and prizes ==
- Fulbright Program grant for travel to the US for scientific work (1979);
- Prize of the USSR Ministry of Higher and Secondary Special Education "For excellent achievements in work" (1980);
- USSR State Prize (1985);
- Corresponding Member of the RANS (1991);
- Honored Scientist of the Russian Federation (1995);
- Medal "In Commemoration of the 850th Anniversary of Moscow" (1997);
- Main Prize "MAIK-SCIENCE" (1998);
- Prize of the competitions of the International Soros Education Program in the field of exact sciences and Moscow Grants (annually in 1995–2002);
- Fredericksz Medal of the Russian Liquid Crystal Society (1998);
- Honored Professor of Moscow State University (1999);
- Valentin Kargin Prize of the Presidium of the Russian Academy of Sciences (2002);
- Lomonosov Prize of Moscow State University (2006);
- Honored Professor in Higher Education in the Russian Federation (2020);
- Elected Corresponding Member of the Russian Academy of Sciences (2008)

== External sources ==
- Profile of Valery Petrovich Shibaev on the official website of the RAS
- Laboratory of Chemical Transformations of Polymers, Division of High Molecular Compounds at Moscow State University (in English)
- LC polymers can be controlled (Infox.ru, 03.03.2009), interviewing V. P. Shibaev on his research group's discovery
- Interview with V.P. Shibaev in the periodical Нефтехимия РФ, No. 1 (49), March 2019.
