= Hrutov =

- Municipality
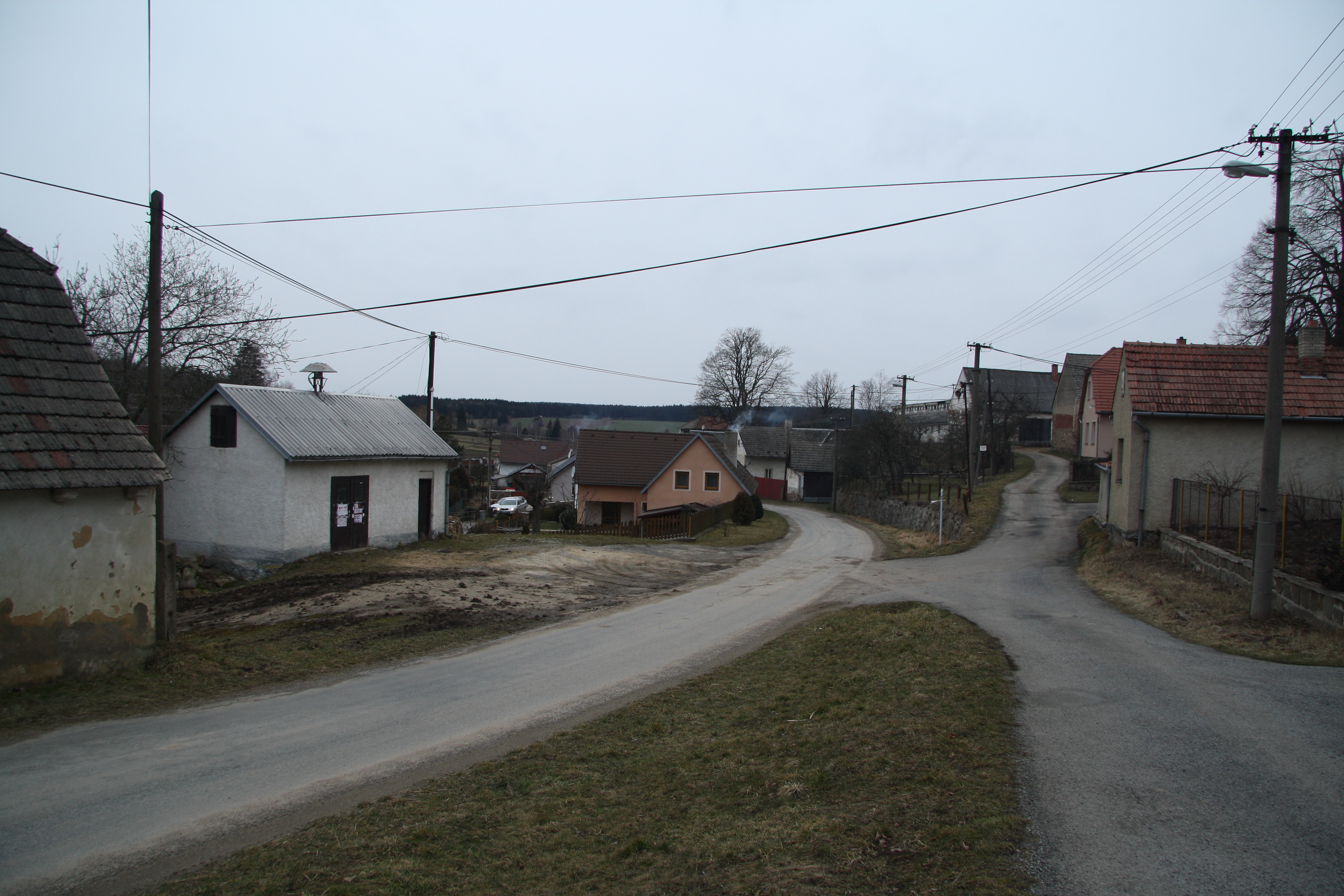
- Centre of Hrutov

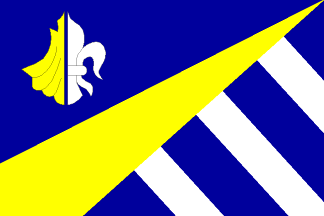
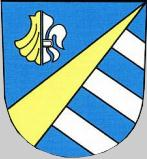
- Flag Coat of arms

- Location in the Czech Republic
- Coordinates: 49°15′20″N 15°40′49″E
- Country: Czech Republic
- Region: Vysočina
- District: Jihlava
- First mentioned: 1490

Area
  - Total: 2.56 km^{2} (0.99 sq mi)
- Elevation: 578 m (1,896 ft)

Population (2026-01-01)
  - Total: 98
  - Density: 38/km^{2} (99/sq mi)
- Time zone: UTC+1 (CET)
  - Summer (DST): UTC+2 (CEST)
- Postal code: 675 27
- Website: www.hrutov.cz

Hrutov (Czech pronunciation: [ˈɦrutof]) is a municipality and village in Jihlava District in the Vysočina Region of the Czech Republic. It has about 100 inhabitants. The municipality forms an enclave in the territory of Kněžice.

Hrutov lies approximately 18 kilometres (11 mi) south-east of Jihlava and 130 km (81 mi) south-east of Prague.

== Demographics ==
Historical population
Year	Pop.	±%
1869	241	—
1880	265	+10.0%
1890	274	+3.4%
1900	246	−10.2%
1910	265	+7.7%
1921	253	−4.5%
1930	233	−7.9%
1950	217	−6.9%
1961	215	−0.9%
1970	197	−8.4%
1980	139	−29.4%
1991	89	−36.0%
2001	83	−6.7%
2011	88	+6.0%
2021	104	+18.2%
Source: Censuses
