= Valentin Kargin =

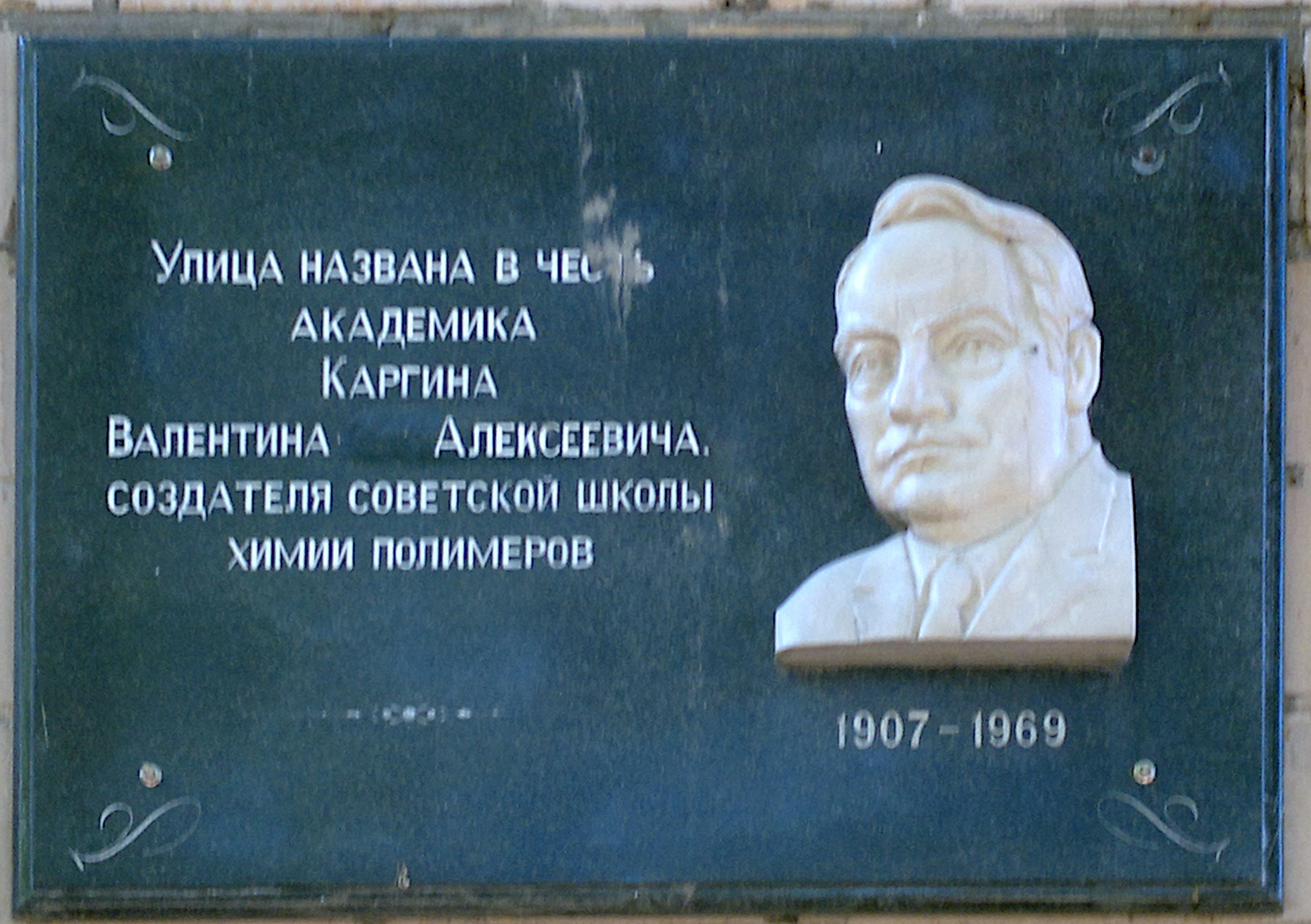
Memorial plaque on Kargin Street in Mytishchi

Valentin Alekseyevich Kargin (Russian: Валентин Алексеевич Каргин; 23 January 1907 – 21 October 1969) was a Soviet and Russian chemist who specialized in physical chemistry and established research in polymer chemistry in the Soviet Union. He considered polymerization as a phase transition.

Kargin was born Yekaterinoslav where his father Aleksei was a mining engineer. He went to school at Klin where the family moved. After graduation in 1922 he worked as a laboratory assistant and in 1924 he became an assistant at the Karpov Institute of Physical Chemistry. In 1925 he joined the Moscow State University and received a degree in 1930 and a doctorate in 1936. Kargin began to work on colloid chemistry, metal organosols and then began to work with macromolecules of cellulose with applications for the production of fibre. In 1940 he was involved in the production of photographic films. In 1943 he was awarded a Stalin Prize for his work in developing protective agents against chemical warfare for the army. He was also involved in the production of transparent organochemical polymers particularly for use in aircraft. After World War II he worked on polymerization reactions and the use of catalysts to produce polymers of various properties. These included polymers with fluorine that could withstand heat and other physical stresses. He also found polymers with semiconductor properties which were used for radar technology. He trained a number of chemists including V. A. Kabanov, N. A. Plate, V. P. Shibaev, N. F. Bakeev, A. B. Zezin, and A. L. Volynsky. He also began an encyclopedia of polymers. The Kargin Research Institute of Polymers was named in his honour in 1969.

Kargin died from a ruptured aorta and he was buried at the Novodevichy Cemetery in Moscow.
