= Vladimír Zoubek =

Czech geologist

Vladimír Zoubek (21 September 1903 in Heřmanův Městec – 24 May 1995 in Prague) was a Czech geologist. He won the Lomonosov Prize for his contributions to geology.

The mineral Zoubekite is named after him.
