= Georgy Lappo =

Soviet and Russian geographer (1923–2020)

- Георгий Лаппо
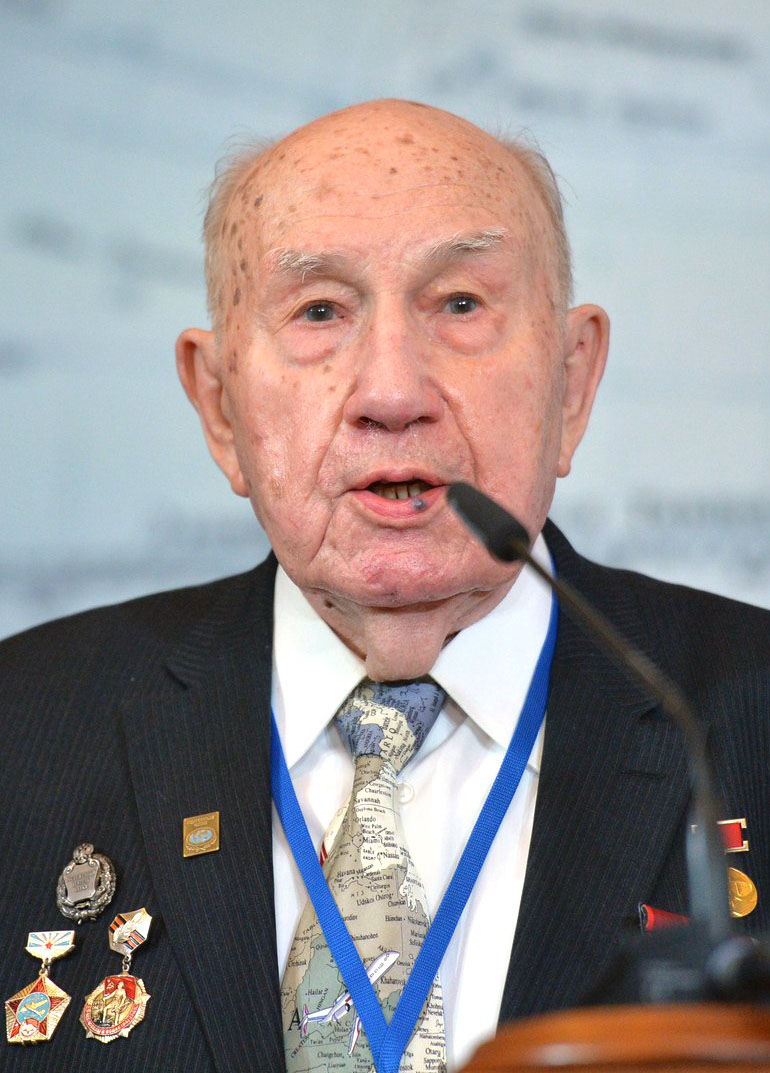
- Born: 18 April 1923; Lgov Soviet Union
- Died: October 9, 2020 (aged 97); Moscow, Russia
- Resting place: Khovanskoye Cemetery
- Citizenship: Russian
- Education: Moscow State University
- Occupation: Geographer
- Scientific career
- Workplaces: IGRAN; MSU Faculty of Geography
- Academic advisors: Nikolay Baransky; Yulian Saushkin; Issak Mayergoyz
- Notable students: Pavel Polian; Sergei Tarkhov

Georgy Mikhailovich Lappo (Russian: Георгий Михайлович Лаппо; April 18, 1923, Lgov - October 9, 2020, Moscow) was a Soviet and Russian urban geographer. Doctor of Geographical Sciences (1975), professor (1988). He is honorary Member of the Russian Geographical Society. Honored Scientist of Russia (1998), laureate of various awards, among them the USSR State Prize (1987).

== Biography ==
He was born in the city of Lgov, Kursk Governorate. In 1940, he entered MIKhMASH, and after completing his first year, during WWI he was conscripted in 1941. After being trained as a radio operator, he served first as a radio operator of an intelligence department of Kalinin Front headquarters, then of a 30th Army headquarters intelligence department, then as a flight radio operator on transport airplanes.

Demobilized in 1946, he worked as a flight radio operator in the aerial survey unit of the Moscow Aerogeodetic Enterprise. Member of the All-Union Communist Party (Bolsheviks) since 1946. In 1953, he graduated in absentia from the Department of Economic Geography of the Geography Faculty of Moscow State University, and in 1953-1956 he studied in graduate school at the same faculty. He defended his PhD dissertation on the topic of "Cities of the Moscow Oblast" in 1962.

In 1957–1963, he worked at the Research Institute of Urban Development and District Planning of the Soviet Academy of Construction and Architecture.

In 1964, Lappo returned to his alma mater and until 1969 was an associate professor at the Faculty of Geography at Moscow State University, where he taught the course "Geography of Cities with the Basics of Urban Development" (published as a monograph, 1969).Since 1969, Georgy Lappo worked at the Institute of Geographical Sciences, studying the problems of urban development in the USSR.

Since 1973, he has headed the Department of Economic Geography at this institute.In 1975, he defended his doctoral dissertation on "Economic and Geographical Problems of Development of Large Urban Agglomerations of the USSR".

In parallel with his scientific work, he lectured at universities in Ufa, Krasnodar, Tashkent, Smolensk and Saransk. Georgy Lappo, among other geo-urbanists, came up with the concept of a framework-network structure of the territory as opposed to the regional approach to studying cities that was dominant in Soviet economic geography. The essence of this concept is that with mature urbanization, cities interact to a greater extent with each other, rather than with the territory surrounding them. In the 1970-80s, this direction was criticized from an ideological position as "anti-zoning", but later became dominant in Russian geo-urban studies.

He is buried at the Khovanskoye Cemetery.

== Awards ==
- Order of the Patriotic War
- Order of the Red Star
- Medal of Zhukov
- Medal "For Distinguished Labour"
- Medal "For the Defence of the Caucasus"
- Medal "For the Victory over Germany in the Great Patriotic War 1941–1945"
- Jubilee Medal "Twenty Years of Victory in the Great Patriotic War 1941–1945"
- Jubilee Medal "Thirty Years of Victory in the Great Patriotic War 1941–1945"
- Jubilee Medal "Forty Years of Victory in the Great Patriotic War 1941–1945"
- Jubilee Medal "50 Years of Victory in the Great Patriotic War 1941–1945"
- Jubilee Medal "60 Years of Victory in the Great Patriotic War 1941–1945"
- Jubilee Medal "65 Years of Victory in the Great Patriotic War 1941–1945"
- Jubilee Medal "70 Years of Victory in the Great Patriotic War 1941–1945"
- Medal "Veteran of Labour"
- Jubilee Medal "50 Years of the Armed Forces of the USSR"
- Jubilee Medal "60 Years of the Armed Forces of the USSR"
- Jubilee Medal "70 Years of the Armed Forces of the USSR"
- Medal "In Commemoration of the 850th Anniversary of Moscow"
- Jubilee Medal "75 Years of Victory in the Great Patriotic War 1941–1945"
- Honoured Scientist of Russia
- Honoured Radio operator
- USSR State Prize
- Badge "25 Years of Victory in the Great Patriotic War"
