= Andrey Kapitsa =

Soviet and Russian geographer and Antarctic explorer

- Born: Andrey Petrovich Kapitsa; Андрей Петрович Капица; 9 July 1931; Cambridge, England
- Died: 2 August 2011 (aged 80); Moscow, Russia
- Citizenship: Russia
- Education: MSU Faculty of Geography
- Known for: discovery of the largest subglacial lake in Antarctica, Lake Vostok
- Awards: USSR State Prize (1971), Dmitry Anuchin Prize (1972), Honorary Scientist of Russia
- Scientific career
- Fields: geography
- Workplaces: MSU Faculty of Geography (dean in 1965–1970), RAS

Andrey Petrovich Kapitsa (Russian: Андре́й Петро́вич Капи́ца; 9 July 1931 – 2 August 2011) was a Soviet and Russian geographer and Antarctic explorer, discoverer of Lake Vostok, the largest subglacial lake in Antarctica. He was a member of the Kapitsa family, a scientific dynasty in Russia.

Kapitsa was the first to suggest the existence of Lake Vostok in the region of Vostok Station in Antarctica, based on seismic soundings of the thickness of the Antarctic ice sheet. These measures were obtained during the Soviet Antarctic Expeditions, in four of which Kapitsa participated. The discovery of Lake Vostok was one of the last major geographic discoveries.

== Early life ==
Andrey Kapitsa's father was Nobel Prize-winning physicist Pyotr Kapitsa, and his maternal grandfather was mathematician and naval engineer Aleksey Krylov. Pyotr Kapitsa's sons Sergey and Andrey were born in Cambridge, United Kingdom, where their father was conducting research.

Andrey graduated from Moscow State University, Faculty of Geography, in 1953. He worked in the Laboratory of Experimental Geomorphology at the faculty since.

== Antarctic research and discovery of Lake Vostok ==
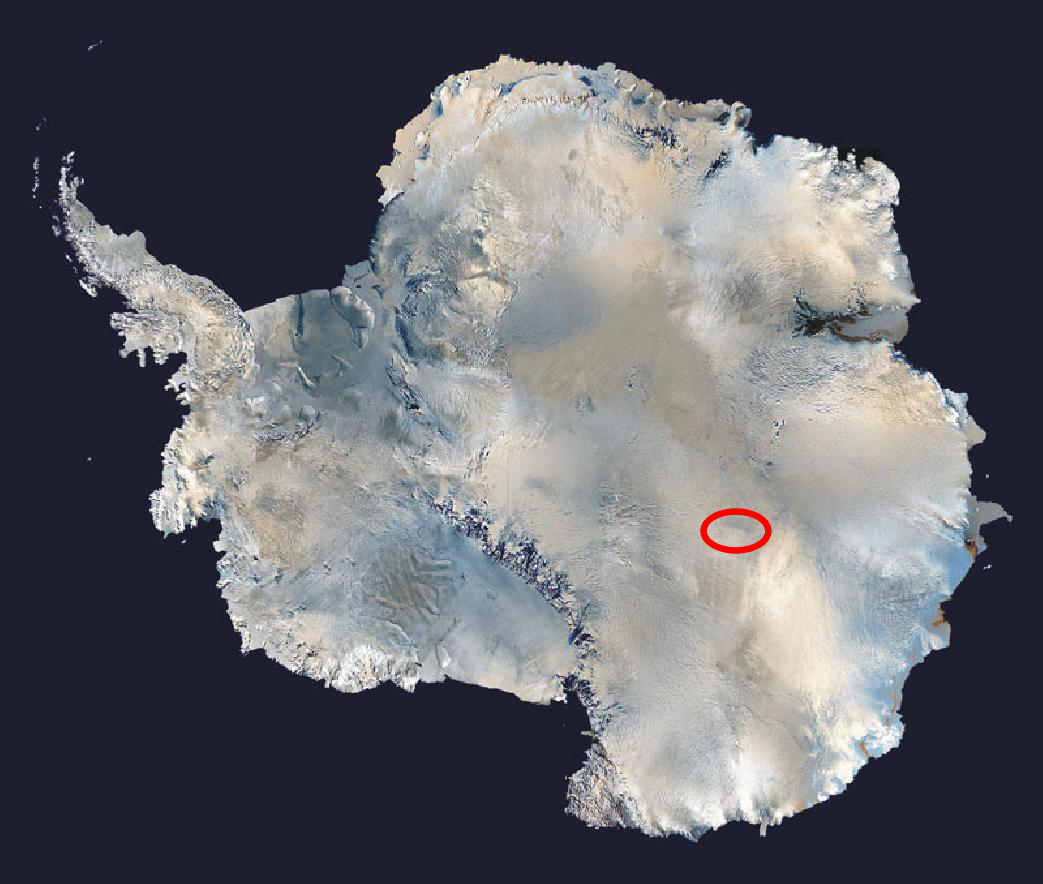
Location of Lake Vostok in East Antarctica

In 1958 Kapitsa defended his Candidate of Sciences thesis "Morphology of East Antarctic Ice Sheet" («Морфология ледникового покрова Восточной Антарктиды»), and in 1968 he defended his Doctor of Science thesis "Subglacial relief of Antarctica" («Подлёдный рельеф Антарктиды»). Kapitsa was a participant in four Soviet Antarctic Expeditions between 1955 and 1964.

At the end of the 19th century Russian scientist Peter Kropotkin proposed the idea of the existence of fresh water under Antarctic ice sheets. He theorized that the tremendous pressure exerted by the cumulative mass of thousands of vertical meters of ice could increase the temperature at the lowest portions of the ice sheet to the point where the ice would melt. Kropotkin's theory was later developed by Russian glaciologist I.A Zotikov, who wrote his PhD thesis on this subject in 1967.

Andrey Kapitsa used seismic soundings in the region of Vostok Station made during the Soviet Antarctic Expeditions in 1959 and 1964 to measure the thickness of the ice sheet, discovering two spikes of reflection (one from bedrock and another from the sediment layer). Kapitsa was the first to suggest the existence of a subglacial lake in this region, which came to be known as Lake Vostok. The lake was named after Vostok Station, which in turn had been named after the Vostok, the 900-ton corvette of the discoverer of Antarctica, Russian explorer Admiral Fabian von Bellingshausen. The word восток means "east" in Russian, and the name of the station and the lake also reflects the fact that they are located in the East of Antarctica.

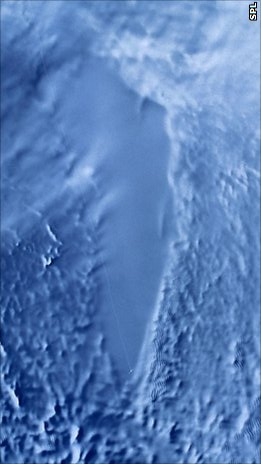
Satellite image of Lake Vostok by NASA

By 1993, the research of Russian and British scientists confirmed the existence of the lake, and subsequent research established its features. Other subglacial lakes were also discovered.

== Later career ==
Kapitsa was the dean of his alma mater MSU Faculty of Geography in 1966–1970. In 1967–1969 he was the leader of the Soviet Academy of Sciences Expedition in the East Africa. He was elected into the ranks of the academy in 1970 and was honored with a 1971 USSR State Prize and 1972 MSU's Dmitry Anuchin Prize for the creation of the Atlas of Antarctica. He supported the theory of natural causes behind the Antarctic ozone hole as well as the theory of natural reasons behind global warming.

Kapitsa died in Moscow on 2 August 2011 at the age of 80. Half a year later, on 6 February 2012, after twenty years of drilling, a team of Russian scientists completed the longest ever ice core of 3,768 meters and pierced the Antarctic ice shield to reach the surface of Lake Vostok.

== Family ==
- Father – Pyotr Kapitsa – a leading Soviet physicist and Nobel Prize in Physics winner for his low temperature research, discoverer of superfluidity.
- Mother – Anna Alekseevna Krylova, daughter of A.N. Krylov.
- Maternal grandfather – Aleksey Nikolaevich Krylov, naval engineer, applied mathematician and memoirist, developer of insubmersibility technique.
- Older brother – Sergey Kapitsa, physicist and demographer, host of the popular and long-running Russian scientific TV show, Evident, but Incredible.

== See also ==
- Pyotr Kapitsa
- Sergey Kapitsa
- List of Russian explorers
- Lake Vostok
