= Natalia Zubarevich =

Russian economic geographer

Natalia Vasilyevna Zubarevich
- Наталья Васильевна Зубаревич
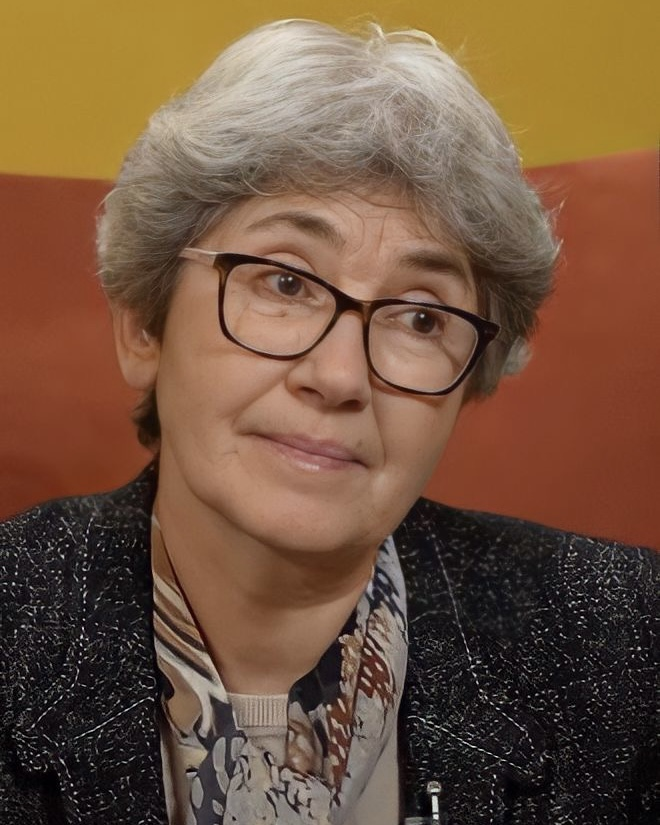
- Zubarevich in 2022
- Born: 7 June 1954 (age 72); Vladimir Oblast, Russian SFSR, USSR
- Citizenship: Soviet Union → Russia
- Education: MSU Faculty of Geography
- Awards: International Leontief Medal, Yegor Gaidar Award, Nikolay Baransky Award
- Scientific career
- Fields: Economic geography, political geography, social geography
- Workplaces: Moscow State University

Voice of Natalya Zubarevich
From the live of Echo of Moscow
March 22, 2014 (CC available)

Natalya Vasilyevna Zubarevich (Russian: Наталья Васильевна Зубаревич, born 7 June 1954) is a Russian economist-geographer specializing on the socio-economic development of the regions. She has been the professor of the Department of Economic And Social Geography of Russia of the Moscow State University since 2005.

== Biography ==
In 1976 Zubarevich graduated from the MSU Faculty of Geography. Since 1977 she has been working at the Department of Economic And Social Geography of Russia, Geography Faculty of Moscow State University. She became the associate professor in 1998 and full professor in 2005. In 2003 she defended her doctoral dissertation on the topic "Social development of Russian regions in the transition period".

From 2003, she served as director of the regional program at the Independent Institute of Social Policy, which produced the ''Social Atlas of Russian Regions''.

In 2010 she became the full member of the Association of Russian Geographers and Social Scientists and the member of the Expert Council of the Association.

Zubarevich constantly participates as a leader and responsible executor in the programs of the Ministry of Economic Development and the Ministry of Labour and Social Protection, as well as in international projects and programs, including projects of the United Nations Development Programme (Annual Reports on Human Development in the Russian Federation), the Moscow Bureau of the International Labor Organization ("Poverty Reduction Strategy in Russia"), TACIS Programs ("Reforming the social protection system in the Russian Federation" and "Monitoring regional reforms in the Russian Federation"), the World Bank Social Projects Fund ("Development of a methodology for forming a model for the development of social infrastructure in the region"), etc.

Zubarevich also lectures at universities and public bodies of Kazakhstan, Kyrgyzstan, Azerbaijan, Ukraine, the Netherlands, and Germany at the invitation of international organizations.

In September 2020, Zubarevich supported the Belarusian protests.

== The theory of the Four Russias ==
Professor Zubarevich is the author of the "theory of the four Russias", developed by her from the center-peripheral model of space development (center and periphery) that has existed in economic geography since the 1970s. Russia, in socio-economic terms, is internally heterogeneous, divided into relatively developed cities and a backward province.

- Russia-1 includes Moscow and the million-plus cities, where 21% of the Russian population lives. 12 cities of the country are mainly post-industrial society (with the exception of Omsk, Perm, Chelyabinsk, Volgograd and Ufa), they concentrate the middle class of Russia. The main internal migration is directed to these cities: millionaires attract the population of their regions, while Moscow attracts people from the whole country. This category may include cities with a population of over 500 thousand or over 250 thousand inhabitants (which is about 36% of the country's population). These people have access to jobs, markets, culture and the Internet.
- Russia-2 includes industrial cities, single—industry towns, with a population of 20 to 250 thousand inhabitants (as well as larger industrial cities such as Togliatti, Cherepovets, etc.). The population of these cities, which makes up 25% of the country's population, is employed mainly in industry, is poorly educated and continues to lead, according to the author, a "Soviet lifestyle". The solvency of the population is low.
- Russia-3 includes the Russian hinterland like small towns and villages, where 38% of the total population of the country lives. In these localities, the population is shrinking and aging.
- Russia-4 includes the republics of the North Caucasus and southern Siberia (Tyva, Altai) that account for less than 6% of the country's population. The economy of these regions depends on the support of the federal center.
