= List of shipyards of the Soviet Union =

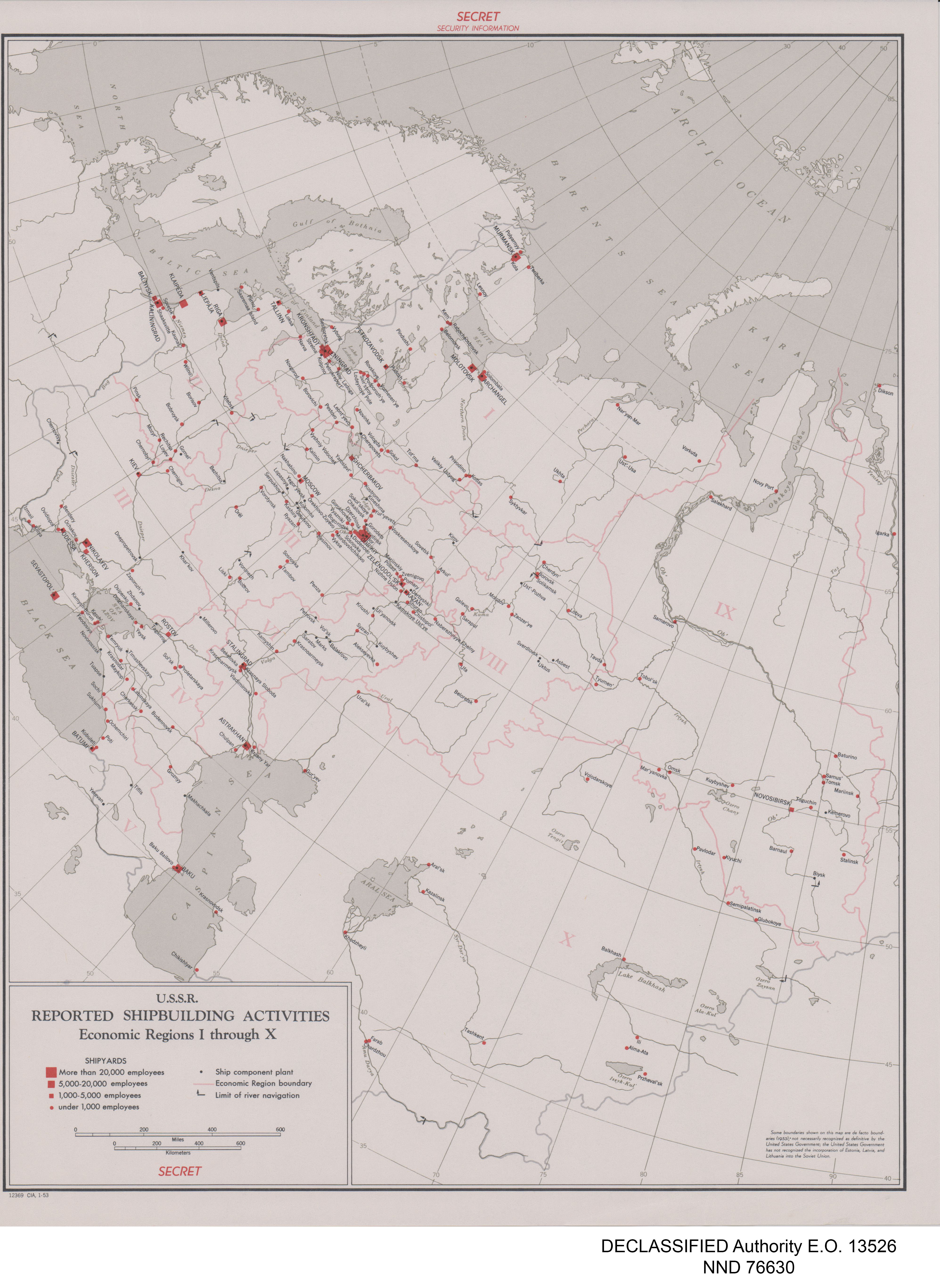
Shipyards in the eastern Soviet Union, 1953

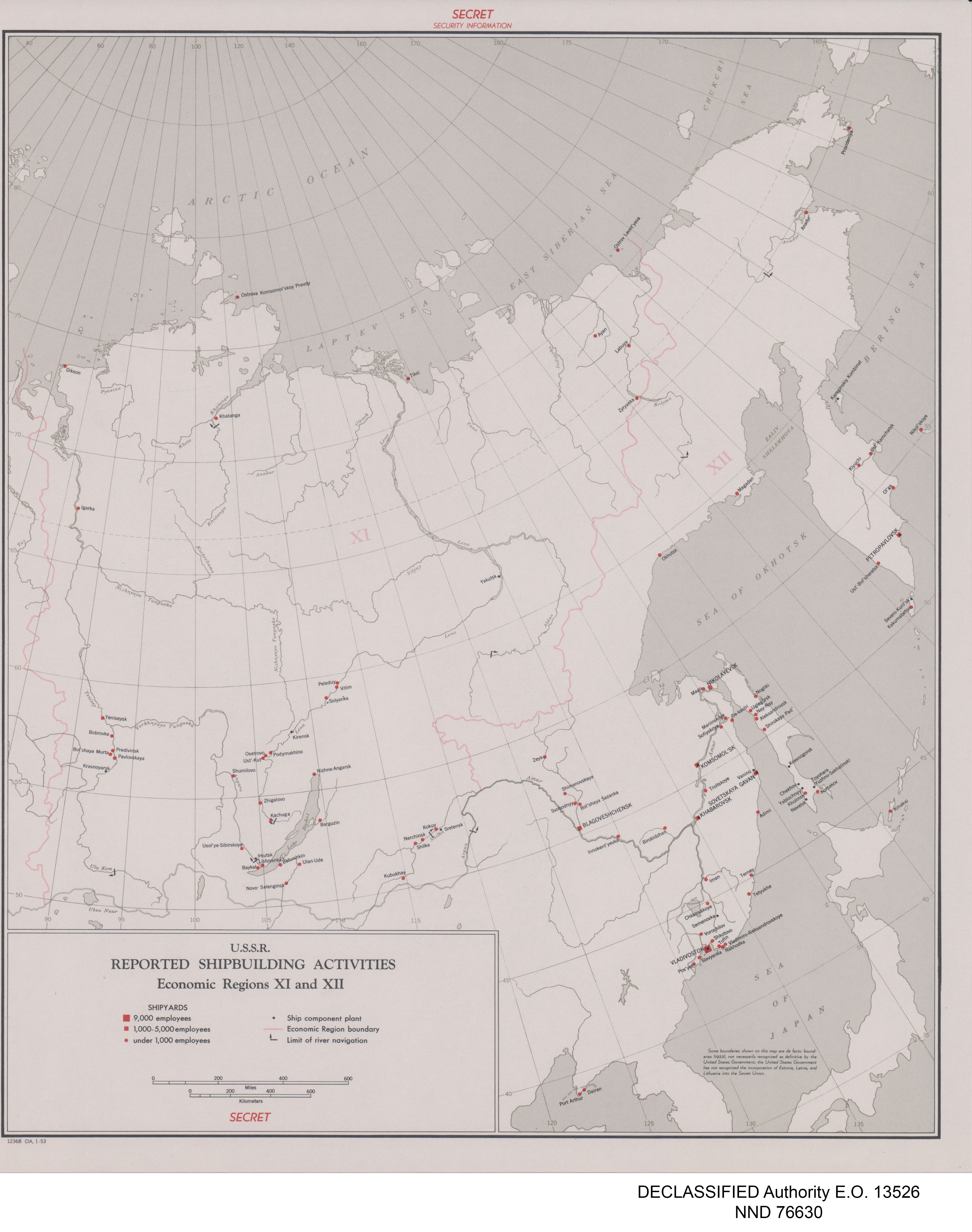
Shipyards in the western Soviet Union, 1953

This is a list of shipyards and shipbuilding companies of the Soviet Union (1922–1991).

== Shipyards ==
=== Baltic Sea ===
==== Russia ====
- Admiralty Shipyards, Shipyard No. 194, known from 1937 to 1966 as Andre Marti Shipyard (ru), Leningrad
- Almaz Shipbuilding Company, Leningrad
- Baltic Shipyard, Shipyard No. 189 Leningrad
- Sredne-Nevskiy Shipyard, Leningrad
- Severnaya Verf, Shipyard No. 190, known between 1935- 1989 as Zhdanov Shipyard, Leningrad
- Sudomekh, Shipyard No. 196, Leningrad, merged with Admiralty yard in 1972
- Petrozavod Shipyard, Leningrad

==== Baltic states ====
- Tallinn Shipyard, Tallinn
- Klaipeda Shiprepair Yard, Klaipėda

=== Black Sea ===
==== Ukraine / Crimea ====
- Black Sea Shipyard, Nikolayev South Shipyard, Shipyard No. 444, also known as Andre Marti (South) Yard (Shipyard No. 198), Nikolayev
- Kherson Shipyard, Kherson
- Okean Shipyard, Nikolayev
- Shipyard named after 61 Communards, Nikolaev North Shipyard, Shipyard No. 200, also known as Shipyard No. 445, Nikolayev
- Zaliv Shipbuilding yard, Shipyard No. 532, Kerch
- Sevastopol Shipyard, Zavod imeni Sergo Ordzhonikidze No. 201, Sevastopol
- More Shipyard, Feodosiya

=== Sea of Azov ===
==== Russia ====
- Azov Verf, a shipbuilding and shiprepair yard in Azov

==== Ukraine ====
- Mariupol Shipyard, Mariupol

=== Barents Sea ===
- Russian Shipyard Number 10, Polyarny

=== White Sea ===
- Severnoye Mashinostroitelnoye Predpriyatie Sevmash, Shipyard 402, Severodvinsk
- Zvezdochka shipyard, Severodvinsk

=== Pacific Ocean ===
- Dalzavod Yard, Shipyard No. 202, Vladivostok
- Zvezda shipyard, Bolshoy Kamen

=== Inland ===
- Amur Shipbuilding Plant, Leninskiy Komsomol Shipyard, Shipyard No. 199, Komsomolsk-on-Amur
- Krasnoye Sormovo Factory No. 112 named after Andrei Zhdanov, Gorky
- Leninska Kuznya Shipyard, Kiev
- Ural Machine Works, Sverdlovsk
- Zelenodolsk Gorky Plant named after A. M. Gorkiy, Zelenodolsk

== Design Bureaus ==
- Rubin Design Bureau
- Malakhit Design Bureau
- Severnoye Design Bureau

== See also ==
- Shipbuilding in Russia
- List of Russian shipbuilders
