= Baburin =

Baburin (masculine, Russian: Бабурин) or Baburina (feminine, Russian: Бабуринa) is a Russian surname. Notable people with the surname include:

- Aleksey Baburin (born 1949), Ukrainian politician
- Alexander Baburin, Russian-Irish International Grandmaster of Chess
- Evgeny Baburin (born 1987), Russian basketball player
- Sergey Baburin, Russian nationalist politician
- Yegor Baburin (born 1993), Russian football player
- Vyacheslav Baburin, Russian economic geographer and regional scientist
