= Kolosovsky =

Kolosovsky (masculine), Kolosovskaya (feminine), or Kolosovskoye (neuter) may refer to:

- Kolosovsky District, a district of Omsk Oblast, Russia
- Nikolay Kolosovsky (1891–1954), Russian/Soviet geographer and economist
