= Ilya Slepov =

Russian triathlete

Personal information
- Native name: Илья Вячеславович Слепов
- National team: Russia
- Born: 10 April 1981 (age 45) Moscow, Russian SFSR, Soviet Union
- Home town: Moscow, Novogireyevo District
- Education: Moscow State University, Faculty of Geography (2003); Moscow School of Management SKOLKOVO (2016)
- Occupation(s): businessman, sportsman
- Height: 188 cm (6 ft 2 in)
- Weight: 82 kg (181 lb)

Sport
- Country: Russia
- Sport: triathlon, orienteering
- Club: Laboratoriya bega
Medal record
Representing Russia
Men's winter triathlon
European Championships
| Bronze medal – third place | 2013 Tartu |
Men's orienteering
Junior European Cup
| Silver medal – second place | 2003 France |

Ilya Vyacheslavovich Slepov (Russian: Илья Вячеславович Слепов, born 10 April 1981 in Moscow) is a Russian triathlete and orienteer, and a Master of Sports of Russia in orienteering. He is also known as the founder and co‑owner of the Laboratoriya Bega (RunLab) sports shop chain and of various sports equipment enterprises.

== Biography ==
Ilya Slepov was born on 10 April 1981 in Moscow to Vyacheslav Sergeevich Slepov (born 15 March 1950, an engineer) and Elena Ivanovna Slepova (born 25 December 1952). He graduated from School No. 411 in 1998, and then studied at the MSU Faculty of Geography from 1998 to 2003. He continued his orienteering career during his studies. He resides in the Novogireyevo District of Moscow.

== Sports career ==
Slepov was interested in running and orienteering from childhood. He began orienteering at SDYUSHOR School No. 54, under his first coach, I.A. Tyurina. His subsequent coaches included N.V. Morosanova, N.A. Valuyev, and S.V. Balandinsky. In May 1991, he made his debut in orienteering competitions and finished in second place. His first diploma, for third place, was won at the Rubezh Slavy competitions in 1989. He won his first Russian Championship medal in 2000 – a silver medal at the final stage in Perm.

In 2005, Slepov made his debut in rogaine at the Russian Championship in Nizhny Novgorod. He was a member of the Russian national orienteering team from 2006 to 2007 and participated in several World Cup stages. Since 2009, he has taken part in amateur triathlon competitions, including Ironman events.

Slepov is known as:

- a multiple champion and medallist in Russian triathlon, marathon, and multi‑sport races (IRONSTAR), Moscow Triathlon, Skolkovo Mile, Grom, and TITAN;
- a winner and medallist in Ironman 70.3 international triathlon races;
- a bronze medallist at the 2013 European Winter Triathlon Championships; and
- a participant in several mountaineering climbs.

== Honours ==
- 2000:
  - (gold) Russian Junior Orienteering Championship (Nizhny Novgorod)
- 2001:
  - (gold) Russian Sports Clubs and Physical Education Clubs Championship – Relay
- 2005:
  - (gold) Russian Mountain Bike Orienteering Cup (Smolensk)
  - (gold) Russian Rogaine Championship – Mixed (Nizhny Novgorod)
- 2006:
  - (gold) Russian Orienteering Cup – overall winner of all four days (Togliatti)
  - (gold) Russian Rogaine Championship – Mixed (Nizhny Novgorod)

== Business activity ==
Slepov became involved in business in 2001, when he began working as a Russian dealer for Polar heart‑rate monitors. Together with Gavrilov, he contacted the Siliconcoach software development team from New Zealand and began a new enterprise. In September 2012, the first RunLab (Laboratoriya Bega) shop was opened in Moscow, and soon RunLab developed its own software for running‑style video analysis. This was one of the first Russian sports shop chains to offer equipment for running. New shops were opened in Moscow and St Petersburg in 2016. Revenue at the end of 2013 was 27 million roubles, with a total profit of 5 million roubles; in 2016, the figures were 145 million roubles and 20 million roubles, respectively. RunLab cooperates with brands such as Asics, Brooks, Saucony, Salomon, and Mizuno, as well as the worldwide trademarks Nike and Adidas. The 'Test Your Run' technology, which helps customers choose sports shoes according to their foot movement, has been adopted by many Adidas shops.

Slepov later expanded RunLab internationally, including a store in Cyprus, which opened after 18 months of delay. As of 2025, the Cyprus location has reached break‑even, despite operating without e‑commerce.

== Sources ==
=== Profiles ===
- Ilya Slepov at World Triathlon
- Statistics at Tristats.ru (in Russian)

=== Business activity ===
- Laboratoriya Bega (RunLab) official site (in Russian)
- Mir Sporta official site (in Russian)
