= Law of hyperbolic growth of the human population =

World population dynamics, in billions of people, from 10,000 BC to 2000 AD

The law of hyperbolic growth of the human population is an empirical law discovered by Heinz von Foerster, which states that the human population of the Earth has grown hyperbolically over several millennia. In the article published by Foerster et al. it was noted that hyperbolic growth is possible only if humanity acts "as a single player", that is, under the condition of some form of cooperation among all people on Earth. Most authors explain the hyperbolic growth by the joint intellectual development of humanity. At the same time, many (S. Kuznets, J. Simon, M. Kremer, S. V. Tsirel, A. V. Korotayev and others) consider the development of technologies as the main factor. A. V. Podlazov highlights life-saving technologies, which are understood not only as production methods but "in general, any knowledge and skills that can be used to save a person from death or prolong their life". S. P. Kapitsa and a number of other authors name the accumulation of knowledge and information in general as the cause of growth.

== Boundaries of the law's application ==
According to statistical data, the law of hyperbolic growth ceased to operate in the 1960–1970s. Since 1989, the absolute rates of world population growth have also begun to decline, so it is no longer possible to speak even of linear population growth. According to the model of the French physician Jean-Noël Biraben, the growth limit will be 10–12 billion people; most other models suggest fairly close levels of world population stabilization. Quite plausible are also scenarios of a decrease in the Earth's population after reaching its maximum value.

Various views have been expressed regarding the beginning of the hyperbolic law's action. In the work of Heinz von Foerster, it was shown that the law of hyperbolic growth has been in effect since the beginning of the Common Era. Astrophysicist Sebastian von Hoerner believed that the hyperbolic law operated throughout the existence of humanity. S. P. Kapitsa, based on the model he developed, calculated the date of the law's beginning as 1.6 million years ago. Other authors usually limit themselves to the period for which there are more or less reliable empirical estimates, for example 40 or 10 thousand years.

Although the general hyperbolic nature of demographic dynamics is not in doubt, a careful analysis of empirical data shows that the parameters of the hyperbola were not constant. In particular, before the beginning of the Common Era (5th–1st millennium BC), the growth rate was higher than later. A significant change in parameters in the 1st millennium AD is masked by the explosive population growth in recent centuries, compared to which all the vicissitudes of previous history seem insignificant.

== Mathematical formulations ==
The law received its name because the dynamics of the Earth's population approximately corresponds to a hyperbola – a second-order mathematical curve:

$$N(t) = \frac{C}{t_0 - t}.$$

Here $N(t)$ is the world population in year $t$, $t_0$ is the so-called singularity, the point in time when the world population would become infinite if hyperbolic growth continued (2025, according to von Hoerner's calculations), $C$ is a constant; for von Hoerner, 200 billion person-years. Hyperbolic growth is most clearly manifested through doublings: each subsequent doubling of humanity's population occurred approximately twice as fast as the previous one. This can be especially clearly observed in the interval 1650–1970.

The law can also be represented in differential form:

$$\frac{dN}{dt} = \frac{N^2}{C},$$

that is, the population growth rate is proportional to the square of the current population. Since these equations correspond to unlimited growth at the singularity point, a number of authors, starting with M. Kremer and S. P. Kapitsa, build models describing the deviation from this singularity, which has actually been occurring since the 1960–1970s.

== Technological justification of hyperbolic growth ==
M. Kremer proposed a rigorous mathematical justification for hyperbolic growth, based on the assumptions that population size is proportional to the level of technological development, and the rate of technological development, in turn, depends on the number of "inventors", which is proportional to the population size. Most models of human population growth developed recently are based on Kremer's equation (for example and others). The model of Korotayev–Malkov–Khalturina stands out especially, which also includes Kremer's equation. Without claiming to describe the entire demographic history of humanity, it very well describes the growth dynamics on the stages of 5000 BC–500 AD and 500–2025 (forecast) years.

In the theory of S. Kuznets–M. Kremer, the literal understanding that in any era per thousand people there is supposedly a constant number of "standard inventors" with unchanging efficiency in improving technologies is criticized. In particular, because "in fact, the vast majority of inventions were obtained in individual, often small, countries in special eras (ancient Greece, Song China, Italy of the Renaissance era, England during the Industrial Revolution and others), while huge regions of the world invented very little" (S. V. Tsirel).

== Life-saving technologies ==
The highlighting of life-saving technologies, proposed by A. V. Podlazov, has the meaning that skills and knowledge contributing to people's survival spread the fastest. In times when humanity was divided by insurmountable distances and communications between peoples were not regular, only such, the most relevant for everyone, information could spread at a sufficient speed for that time. A. V. Podlazov also developed a model that very well describes the dynamics of human population growth.

== Accumulation of information ==
In the works of S. P. Kapitsa the independence of human development from available resources is substantiated. Based on this position, the principle of demographic imperative is advanced, as the self-sufficiency of demography in describing human history. At the same time, leading importance in the cooperative nonlinear mechanism of development is given to the informational interaction of large groups of people. It is the accumulation of information in the process of such interaction that can explain the hyperbolic growth of the human population. Information has a more fundamental character than the technological level and differs from it in integrity: any information can be in demand for creating new technologies, whereas the state of humanity cannot be described by limiting to used technologies.

According to Kapitsa, humanity is near the inflection point of the population growth curve, falling around 2005. After passing this point, a slowdown was expected, symmetric to the era of hyperbolic growth. Kapitsa's works are criticized for excessive physicalism.

The accumulation of information and the associated hyperbolic growth of species diversity was also noted until recently (before human intervention) in the biosphere.

The widely discussed opinion is that further civilization development will be associated precisely with the growth of the volume of information in the human-machine supermind (co-intelligence, synergistic intelligence), possibly based on the Internet. A person can enter the supermind simply as an Internet user, or by improving their biological nature, as a cyborg.

== See also ==
- Exponential growth
- Population boom
- Demographic transition
- Doomsday argument
