= Vyacheslav Baburin =

Russian geographer (born 1951)

- Вячеслав Леонидович Бабурин
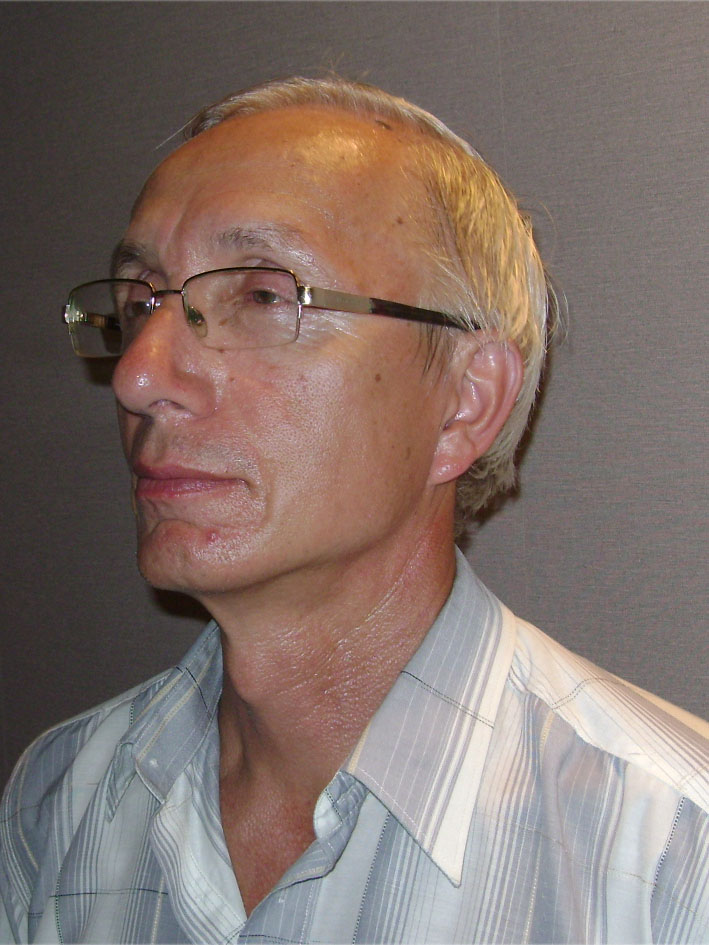
- Baburin in 2012
- Born: Vyacheslav Baburin; 31 May 1951 (age 75); Moscow, Soviet Union
- Education: Moscow State University (1976)
- Known for: Founder of a new direction of economic geography in Russia - innovation geography
- Scientific career
- Fields: Economic geography, regional science
- Workplaces: Department of Economic And Social Geography of Russia MSU Faculty of Geography

Vyacheslav Leonidovich Baburin (Russian: Вячеслав Леонидович Бабурин; born 31 May 1951) — Soviet and Russian economic geographer and regional scientist, educator, made a contribution to understanding of dynamic aspects in economic geography, particularly examining innovation cycles in Russian social and economic system. One of the Russian researchers of interaction between society and environment (effects of climate change on socio-economic development of countries and regions, assessment of damage from natural disasters, impact on society of time zones reduction, influence of mountain environment on economy, the cycles of forestry development, etc.)

== Biography ==
Baburin was born in Moscow. In 1968 he joined the economic faculty of Moscow State University, but he left faculty because of ideological conflicts. During 1969-1971 he served in the Soviet Army in the Strategic Missile Forces.

He graduated from Department of Economic And Social Geography of Russia Moscow State University in 1976. (Specialty - "Economic geography").

Ph.D. in geography (Moscow State University, Department of Geography, Department of Economic And Social Geography of Russia) (1985). His thesis "Territorial organization and management of industry during scientific and technological revolution (on example of the Moscow region)" is devoted to location of the military-industrial complex in Moscow region (it had been marked as "For Official Use Only").

Doctor of Geographical Sciences (Moscow State University, Department of Geography, Department of Economic And Social Geography of Russia) (2002).

== Career ==
From 1996 to 2002 V. Baburin was an assistant professor of economic and social geography of Russia, Faculty of Geography Moscow State University. Since 2002 Baburin is professor of Department of Economic And Social Geography of Russia. From 2012 - head of the department of Economic and Social Geography of Russia.

He participated in the preparation of Russian federal programs:

- "The decision of the social, economic and environmental problems associated with the rise of the Caspian Sea"
- "Integrated Development of the Russian Federation, adjacent to the Caspian Sea" (1994–1998)
- "Kemerovo Region: a regional diagnostics for evaluation of investment attractiveness" (1998).

During last 30 years Baburin engaged in regional analysis and strategic regional planning in Russia.

== Teaching ==
Teaching conducted in Moscow, Ufa, Khabarovsk, Sevastopol and other cities. Today Baburin is a professor of Moscow State University at the Faculty of Geography, as well as in his office in Sevastopol, and the Faculty of Public Administration (Course "Economic and Political Geography").

== Research ==
The participation and leadership of research projects:

- "Pskov highway: an innovative approach to regional development" (Pskov Region Administration, 1997)
- "The main provisions of the strategy and the concept of social and economic development of Krasnodar Region" (Krasnodar Territory Administration, 2000)
- "Assessment of investment attraction and development of proposals for the formation of the promising directions of social and economic policies of the Pskov region" (Pskov Region Administration, 2000)
- "Characteristics of social and economic conditions. / Assessment / Environmental Impact Assessment (EIA). Project" Sakhalin - 1 "(2001-2002).
- "Assessment of the population living in mountain areas of Russia, for the purpose of budget alignment" (Gaidar Institute for Economic Policy, 2001–2002.)
- "Macroeconomic analysis of the uneven economic and social development of regions" (state contract to perform research and development activities, 2002)
- "Economic-geographical problems of restructuring of the Russian economy: the experience of the 1990s and trends in the beginning of the 21st century.» (01.2.00.168001)
- "The development of concepts and conceptual apparatus of the national regional (rayon) school of economic and social geography» (01.2.00.108025),
- "Geographical problems of economic and social development of Central Russia in market conditions."
- "Zoning of Russia as a basis for territorial control and regulation of social and economic processes and methodological approaches (06-06-80277)."
- "Forecasting of impacts of major innovation projects on socio-economic development of regions" (12-06-00400).

== Contributions to science ==
Baburin is the founder of new direction in economic geography in Russia - innovation geography, the researcher of innovation cycles in Russian economy.

== Works ==
- Baburin V. Innovation cycles in the Russian economy. Publ. 4. Moscow: URSS, 2010 (in Russian) .
- Baburin V. Evolution of Russian space: from the Big Bang to the present day (innovation and synergetic approach). Publ. Two. M. LIBROKOM, 2009 (in Russian) .
- Baburin V., Alekseev A., Goryachko M. Climate change, the Northeast Passage and settlement of the Russian Arctic. The Changing Geographies of the Arctic and Northern Regions: III scheduled on Wednesday, 3/25/09. Salt Lake, 2009.
- Baburin V., Kasimov N., Goryachko M. Development of the Black Sea Coast of Caucasus in the Conditions of Changes of the Nature and Society. Proceedings of the ninth international conference on the Mediterranean coastal environment. Sochi, Russia. 10–14 November 2009. Ankara. Turkey, 2009. vol 1–2.
- Baburin V., Goryachko M. Geography of Investment. Textbook. M.: Geogr. Faculty of Moscow. Press, 2009 (in Russian).
- Baburin V., Goryachko M. Strategic Management of regional development: economic-geographical approach. Vestn. of Moscow. University. Ser. Five. Geography. 2009, No. 5 (in Russian).
- Baburin V., Goryachko M. Methods of studying the innovation component of the economy in the municipal area (article). Journal of Economic Geography, Southern Federal University. Rostov-on-Don. 2008, No. 5 (in Russian).
- The space of cycles: World - Russia - Region / Ed. V. Baburin, P. Chistyakov. - M., 2007 (in Russian).
- Baburin, V. Analysis of cyclic processes in the economy / V. Baburin, P. Chistyakov / / Geography and Natural Resources. - 2005. - No. 1. - P.25-33 (in Russian).
- Climate Change in Contrasting River Basins: Adaptation Strategies for Water, Food and Environment. How Much Water will be Available for Irrigation in the Future? The Syr Darya Basin (Central Asia). CABI, 2004.
- Baburin V., Goryachko M. Uneven regional development as a spatial projection of cyclic processes. Proceedings of the RGO. 2004, v. 136, no. 4 (in Russian).
- Baburin V., Kovalev A., Tarasov P. Computer modeling of the national economy. / / Territorial differentiation and regionalization in the world today. Smolensk, the universe. In 2001 (in Russian).
- Baburin V., Mazurov L. Geographical management. M.: Case, 2000 (in Russian).
- Baburin V., Shuvalov V., Danshin A. Socio-economic impact of the Caspian Sea level raising. Proceedings of the RGO. 1998, V.130. No. 2, p. 12-18.
- Baburin V., Gorlov V., Shuvalov V. Issues of Moscow city region's spatial structure. Urban and Suburban Landscapes as the Subject of Geographical Research. Warsaw: - 1998.
- Baburin V. Business games of economic and social geography. MA: Education, 1995 (in Russian).
- Baburin V. Industrial complex of the Moscow region: patterns of development / / Location of industry in terms of intensification of production. M., 1989 (in Russian).

== See also ==
- Department of Economic And Social Geography of Russia
- MSU Faculty of Geography
- Nikolay Baranskiy
