= 1957 Soviet economic reform =

The 1957 Economic Reform in the Soviet Union (Russian: Экономическая реформа 1957 года в СССР) was a reform of national economic management carried out in 1957–1965. It was characterized by the replacement of the centralized sectoral management system, which had been used since the mid-1930s, with a decentralized, territorially distributed system, which in Soviet literature was called the "territorial principle management system". It is associated with First Secretary of the Central Committee of the CPSU and (since 1958) Chairman of the Council of Ministers of the Soviet Union, Nikita Khrushchev.

The reform consisted of dividing the territory of the Soviet Union into so-called "economic administrative regions" with the creation of a network of territorial economic councils within the regions, territories, and republics of the Soviet Union, to whose jurisdiction enterprises previously subordinate to industrial and agro-industrial ministries were transferred. According to the initiators of the reform, decentralization of the production management system would increase its growth, improve product quality, optimize resource distribution, reduce equipment repair costs, and improve the organization of material and technical supplies.

However, the short period of decentralization in the first years of the reform, aimed at breaking the rigidly centralized sectoral management system that had been in place since the mid-1930s, led to the destruction of a unified technical policy and the disintegration of economic ties in industry and agriculture. An attempt to rectify the situation by consolidating economic councils and merging administrative economic regions led to the emergence of intermediate levels of management in the form of republican and union councils of the national economy and sectoral state committees. Research, design, and engineering organizations that were under the jurisdiction of sectoral management bodies were cut off from industrial enterprises, which continued to be subordinate to territorial bodies. This led to a decrease in the quality of design, construction and reconstruction of enterprises, slowed down the introduction of new technologies, machines and equipment and, as a result, led to a decrease in the quality of industrial products.

Nevertheless, this reform led to significant economic growth. The transformation of the industrial management system from sectoral to territorial and the evolution of the latter into a hybrid "production-territorial" system could not eliminate the fundamental contradiction between the historically established system of vertical integration of production in industries and the attempt to manage industries on a territorial principle.

The problems of the Soviet economy continued to worsen, and by 1965 the trend towards centralization prevailed. As part of the 1965 Soviet economic reform, the economic councils were liquidated, and the territorially distributed system of economic management through economic councils was replaced by a rigidly centralized sectoral management system through sectoral ministries and inter-sectoral state committees that composed the Council of Ministers of the Soviet Union, which was familiar to the party and economic nomenklatura.

== History ==
=== Initiation of reform ===
After the death of Joseph Stalin in 1953, the leaders of the country and the party took a course on developing socially oriented sectors of the economy - construction, agriculture, light industry and production of consumer goods. However, by 1955, the course on the preferential development of consumer goods production was rejected in favour of the accelerated development of heavy industry. At the 20th Congress of the CPSU in 1956, a program for the formation of a single national economic complex of the Soviet Union was adopted. The implementation of the program was to ensure continuous technical progress, rapid growth in labour productivity, the development of strategically important industries and, as a result, an increase in the standard of living of the Soviet people, which was to bring the Soviet Union to first place in the world and demonstrate the superiority of the socialist economy over the capitalist one.

At the end of January 1957, a note from the First Secretary of the CPSU Central Committee Nikita Khrushchev on improving the management of industry and construction was sent to a wide circle of country leaders for discussion. The essence of the note was a proposal to abolish departmental subordination of enterprises and transfer them to the regions. Industry ministries were to be liquidated as unnecessary. It was assumed that such a reorganization would significantly increase the growth of industrial production, improve the quality of manufactured products, resources would be distributed more rationally, and the problems that the Soviet economy faced would be solved more quickly. One of the reasons for the appearance of the note on the need to decentralize management was the growing budget deficit of the Soviet Union: to cover foreign currency expenses, it was necessary to sell more and more gold abroad. The ideological background of decentralization was Khrushchev's desire to create a "people's state" in which the broad masses of workers would be involved in all spheres of management, including production, where this course was expressed in the decentralization and de-bureaucratization of the country's economy. According to Khrushchev, the existing centralization of management gave rise to "a number of abnormal phenomena", preventing society "from coming to a communist society, having such an excessively centralized system of economic management".

At the plenum of the Central Committee of the CPSU, which was held in February 1957, a discussion was held on the reform of the economic management system. Khrushchev's proposal was supported by the First Secretary of the Central Committee of the Communist Party of Uzbekistan, Nuritdin Mukhitdinov, the Chairman of the Council of Ministers of the Ukrainian SSR, Nikifor Kalchenko, the First Secretary of the Leningrad Regional Party Committee, Frol Kozlov, the Secretary of the Moscow Regional Party Committee Ivan Kapitonov; against were the First Deputy Chairman of the Council of Ministers of the Soviet Union Mikhail Pervukhin, the Minister of State Control Vyacheslav Molotov, the Chairman of the Presidium of the Supreme Soviet of the Soviet Union Kliment Voroshilov, the First Secretary of the Central Committee of the Communist Party of Ukraine Petro Shelest, the Chairman of the State Planning Committee of the Soviet Union Nikolai Baibakov and his First Deputy Alexey Kosygin. However, Khrushchev's opinion prevailed, and at the session of the Supreme Soviet of the Soviet Union that followed the party plenum, a resolution was unanimously adopted on the creation of local councils of the national economy (sovnarkhozy, SNKH).

=== Decentralization period (1957-1962) ===
Before the reform, industry and construction were managed by sectoral ministries, which in 1957 were responsible for over 200,000 enterprises. The beginning of the reform was marked by the abolition of 25 of the 37 union and union-republican ministries for industry and construction, and the transfer of the enterprises under their control to the direct subordination of economic councils. The remaining ministries retained the "functions of planning the relevant branches of industry and ensuring a high technical level in the development of production". The same reorganization was carried out at the level of the republics of the Soviet Union. The State Commission of the Council of Ministers of the Soviet Union for Long-Term Planning of the National Economy was transformed into the State Planning Committee (Gosplan); in place of the abolished State Committee of the Council of Ministers of the Soviet Union for New Technology (Gostechnika), the State Scientific and Technical Committee of the Council of Ministers of the Soviet Union was formed. To implement the reform, 105 administrative economic regions were created in the Soviet Union, 70 of which were in the RSFSR. Each such region had a national economy council with its own sectoral and functional departments and divisions, where economic management issues were resolved in relation to the given economic administrative region depending on its specialization. In March 1958, Khrushchev, while remaining the leader of the party, also took the post of head of the Soviet government, which, in the opinion of the country's leadership, should have contributed to the promotion of the reform of national economic management. Decentralization of industrial management made it possible for the first time in Soviet public administration practice to bring management bodies as close as possible to the lowest management objects - industrial enterprises. Thanks to this, the processes of planning, coordination, supply, construction, etc. were significantly accelerated. The possibilities for inter-industry cooperation within the boundaries of a single administrative economic region expanded, which created the prerequisites for the formation of complex territorial production systems on the territory of economic regions. At the same time, the territorial approach to industrial management led to the disruption of established economic and production links between enterprises in the same industry, since as a result of the reform the enterprises found themselves in different administrative economic regions and were subordinated to different economic councils. Problems associated with the uneven regional economic development of the country also emerged. For example, the northwestern and central regions of the RSFSR had a much more developed industrial base - especially in the field of shipbuilding, instrument making, automobile manufacturing, machine tool manufacturing, electrical engineering, electronics, construction materials production, light and chemical industries - and qualified personnel, including management, than the Central Asian regions of the Soviet Union, whose economies were dominated by agriculture. For this reason, less economically developed regions were doomed to chronically lag in the development of their territorial production complexes.

The first stage of the reform was accompanied by propaganda campaigns and slogans. In January 1959, at the 21st Congress of the CPSU, the "complete and final" victory of socialism in the Soviet union was declared and a Seven-year Plan for the development of the national economy for 1959-65 was approved. The plan envisaged "catching up with and overtaking" the capitalist countries and bringing the Soviet economy to first place in the world in terms of production per capita. At the 22nd Congress of the CPSU, held in October 1961, a new, Third Program of the CPSU was presented - a program for building a communist society in the Soviet Union. In the area of economics, the program called for creating the material and technical base of communism within ten years (1961–71) through the electrification of the country, comprehensive mechanization and mass automation of production. It was supposed to increase the volume of industrial production by 6 times within 20 years, to double labour productivity within 10 years, and to double the level of labour productivity in the United States within 20 years.

=== The Centralization Period (1962-1964) ===
Since the early 1960s, the gradual return of centralization to the economic management system, which was familiar to the party and economic nomenclature, began. First, economic councils of the union republics were created at the republican level - the Russian SSR, Ukrainian SSR and Kazakh SSR. To coordinate their activities, the Supreme Soviet of the National Economy was created in November 1962, and then the process of consolidating local economic councils began by merging economic administrative districts into larger economic districts. As a result of the consolidation, the number of such districts was reduced from 105 to 43. The consolidation of economic councils caused a chain reaction of changes in other elements of the management system. In particular, the economic planning system was reorganized, as a result of which regional councils for the coordination and planning of production activities appeared at the local level. Production collective and state farm administrations were also formed. In March 1963, the Supreme Council of the National Economy was created under the Council of Ministers of the Soviet Union, which was assigned the role of "the highest state body ... to resolve issues related to the work of industry and construction, and to ensure the successful implementation of state plans". In order to implement a unified technical policy, state production committees were created in place of the abolished industrial ministries - industry management bodies that concentrated under their jurisdiction research, design and project organizations serving the production needs of enterprises subordinate to the economic councils. By the mid-1960s, contrary to the originally planned program, the trend of centralized industry management of the country's economy actually gained the upper hand.

The reforms of the economic management bodies were accompanied by the reorganization of the administrative-territorial division of the Soviet Union and the restructuring of the activities of local party and soviet bodies. In November 1962, the plenum of the CPSU Central Committee decided to divide the party bodies into industrial and agricultural. It was assumed that such a division would improve party management of enterprises in the context of the territorial system of industrial management formed by the economic reform. As a result of these transformations, the number of local party and soviet bodies in each administrative region of the country doubled - some dealt with industrial issues, others with agriculture; at the same time, the intervention of party bodies in the system of economic management led to the actual replacement of soviet bodies with party ones.

=== Curtailment of the reform (1964-1965) ===
The transformations aimed at introducing elements of sectoral coordination and centralization into the territorial management system were unable to eliminate the fundamental contradiction between the vertical sectoral organization of production in the Soviet Union, the roots of which went back to the rigidly centralized sectoral management system formed over decades, and the attempt at territorial, non-sectoral management of production, which was undertaken during the implementation of the 1957 reform. By the mid-1960s, the management system had transformed from territorial to territorial-sectoral, which exacerbated its ineffectiveness. The impotence of the economic councils to solve the economic problems of the Soviet Union became obvious.

On October 14, 1964, Khrushchev, the main initiator and supporter of the reform, was removed from the leadership of the party and government with the wording "for health reasons". A year later, in September 1965, a plenum of the Central Committee of the CPSU was held, at which it was declared that "management of industry on the territorial principle, while somewhat expanding the possibilities of inter-industry specialization and cooperation of industrial production within economic regions, led to a restraint in the development of industry specialization and production links between enterprises located in different economic regions, alienated science from production, and led to fragmentation and multi-stage management of industries". The participants in the plenum decided on the need to return to management of industry on the industry principle. Following the discussion of the implementation of the reform at the plenum, a resolution was issued, which, in the laudatory tone traditional for programmatic party and Soviet documents, noted that "the Soviet people, under the leadership of the Communist Party, have achieved great success in communist construction" and listed the high economic results achieved during the period from 1960 to 1965; briefly outlined the problems encountered in the attempt to reform the industrial management system; it concluded that “further development of industry ... and an increase in the efficiency of social production require improvements in industrial management”. A few days later, the Supreme Soviet of the Soviet Union issued a corresponding law, which provided for the abolition of the system of economic councils and the restoration of the management system through industry ministries.

== Results of the reform ==
The 1957 reform did not bring the desired results and ended with a return to a centralized system of industrial management. The reform also failed to solve the problem of the growing expenditure of the country's gold reserves. In the period from 1953 to 1965, the Soviet government sold over 3 thousand tons of gold through Moscow Narodny Bank. If in 1953, 250-300 tons of gold were spent on purchasing food abroad, then in 1963–1964, when the reform gained full force, gold sales amounted to 1,244 tons. The monetary reform carried out in 1961 led to the devaluation of the ruble. In 1962, there began to be interruptions in the supply of industrial goods and food products to populated areas.

The increase in retail prices for meat, meat products and butter, together with the deterioration of working conditions, caused a wave of strikes and workers' demonstrations in Krasnodar, Riga, Kyiv, Chelyabinsk, Leningrad, Omsk, Kemerovo, Donetsk, Artemyevsk, Kramatorsk. The suppression of a workers' strike in Novocherkassk in 1962 was accompanied by the use of firearms and ended with the arrests and criminal prosecution of the strikers.

The growth rates of industry and agriculture continued to decline. A particularly sharp slowdown in growth was observed in the agriculture sector, where instead of the planned 70%, the growth of agricultural production by 1965 was only 15%. The development of virgin lands turned the Soviet Union into a wheat exporter in the mid-1950s. However, droughts, dust storms, and the illiterate use of some lands in the southern regions, due to their peculiarities, led to a catastrophic drop in the productivity of virgin lands. After this, the leadership of the Soviet Union, for the first time in the history of the country, decided to purchase millions of tons of grain abroad. In 1963, 12.1 million tons of wheat were purchased abroad, in 1964 - 50 thousand tons of rice, in 1965 - 90 thousand tons of soybeans, which cost the state more than 1 billion US dollars. In general, the problem of shortages and quality of consumer goods was not solved. In 1962, only 5.3% of Soviet families had refrigerators (for comparison, in the USA - 98.3%).

A positive result of the reform was the impressive quantitative economic indicators compared to economically developed countries. In particular, by 1965 the national income of the Soviet Union increased by 53% compared to 1958, production assets grew by 91%, and industrial production by 84%. Real incomes of the population increased by one third. Salaries and pensions for collective farmers were introduced. Due to the construction of buildings from large factory-made panels, the housing stock increased by 40%. In the period from 1950 to 1964, the area of housing increased by 2.3 times. Russian historian V. A. Krasilshchikov assessed the economic achievements of that period as follows:

The Khrushchev decade is one of the most important periods in the history of Russia/Soviet Union in the 20th century from the point of view of modernization. Never during the 18th–20th centuries had the gap between Russia/Soviet Union and the West been as small as in those years

The practical experience of territorial management of the economy was used to clarify and develop the theory of formation of territorial-production complexes, the foundations of which were laid by the Soviet economist Nikolay Kolosovsky. During the implementation of the reform, the systemic shortcomings of the Soviet economy and planning and management methods, which slowed down the growth of labour productivity in the national economy, were clearly revealed. This stimulated the all-Union economic discussion in 1962–1964, which in 1965 resulted in the Kosygin reform.
