= FGW =

FGW may refer to:

- Fishguard & Goodwick railway station, in Wales
- First Great Western, now Great Western Railway, a British train operating company
- Flexural gravity wave
