= List of Russian marine engineers =

This list of Russian marine engineers includes naval engineers and inventors of the Tsardom of Russia, Russian Empire, the Soviet Union and the Russian Federation.

== Alphabetical list ==
=== A ===
- Oleg Anikanov, supervised the construction of the first dry dock complexes in the USSR for maintaining and repairing nuclear submarines, construction of naval bases for the Northern and Baltic Fleets, and at Cam Ranh and Tartus.
- Rostislav Alexeyev, designer of high-speed hydrofoils (Raketa) and ekranoplans, including the Caspian Sea Monster
- Anatoly Alexandrov, inventor of degaussing, developer of naval nuclear reactors (including one for the first nuclear icebreaker)

=== B ===
- Agustín de Betancourt, polymath-engineer and urban planner, co-designed the first Russian steamship
- Charles Baird, industrialist who built the first Russian steamship
- Mikhail Britnev, designer of the first metal-hull icebreaker Pilot
- Ivan Bubnov, marine engineer and designer of Battleships and submarines for the Imperial Russian Navy.

=== D ===
- Stefan Drzewiecki, designed the first electric-powered submarine and the first midget submarine, designed the first multi-person submarine and developed blade element theory.

=== J ===
- Boris Jacobi, inventor of electric boat, developer of modern naval mining

=== K ===
- Konstantin Khrenov, inventor of underwater welding
- Viktor Kozin, inventor of resonance method of ice destruction
- Alexey Krylov, general of the fleet, inventor of gyroscopic damping of ships, author of the unsinkability theory
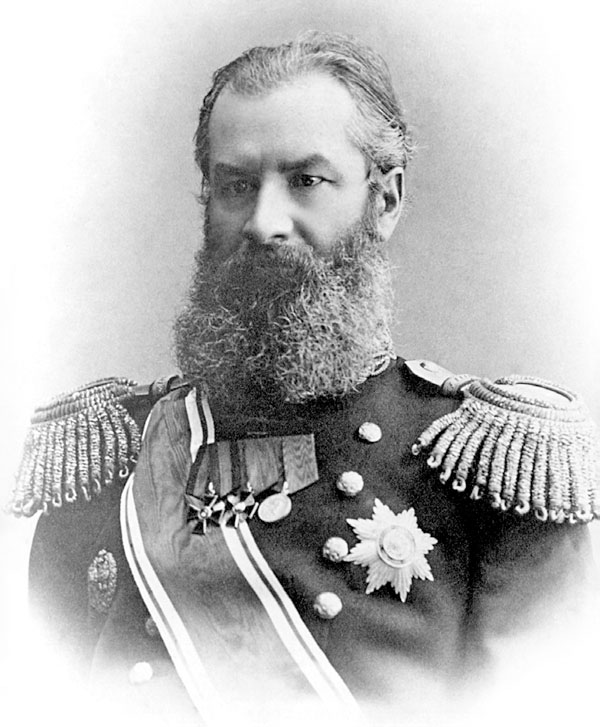
  Krylov

=== L ===
- Fyodor Litke, explorer, oceanographer, inventor of recording tide measurer

=== M ===
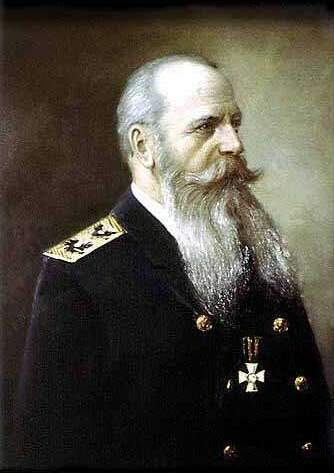
Makarov

- Stepan Makarov, Admiral and war hero, oceanographer, inventor of torpedo boat tender, builder of the first polar icebreaker, author of the insubmersibility theory
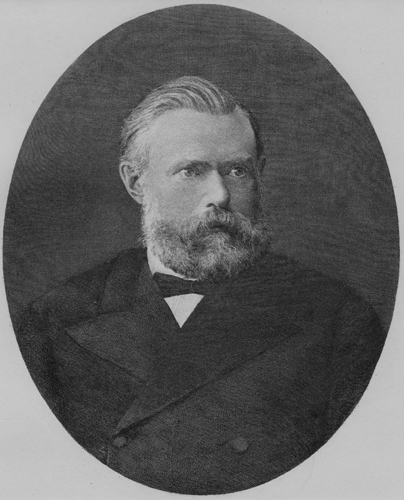
  Nobel
- Victor Makeev, developer of the first intercontinental submarine-launched ballistic missile

=== N ===
- Ludvig Nobel, designer of the modern oil tanker

=== P ===
- Andrey Popov, Admiral and war hero, designed the first true Russian battleship Pyotr Velikiy
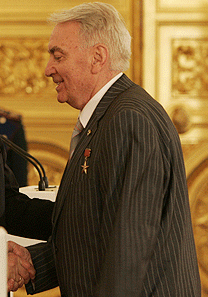
  Spassky

=== R ===
- Peter the Great (Romanov), monarch and craftsman, inventor of yacht club and sounding line with separating plummet, founder of the Russian Navy

=== S ===
- Johan Eberhard von Schantz, admiral, designer of gunboats and warships for the Imperial Russian Navy.
- Pavel Schilling, inventor of electric naval mine
- Igor Spassky, designer of the Sea Launch platform and over 200 nuclear submarines, including the world's largest submarines (Typhoon class)

=== Y ===
- Vladimir Yourkevitch, designer of SS Normandie, developer of modern ship hull design

== See also ==
- List of Russian inventors
- Defence industry of Russia
- Shipbuilding in Russia
- Russian Navy
