= Department of Economic And Social Geography of Russia =

Part of the Faculty of Geography of Moscow State University

- Established: 1929
- Parent institution: Moscow State University
- Department head: Vyacheslav Baburin
- Location: Moscow
- Website: http://www.ecoross.ru/

The Department of Economic And Social Geography of Russia (Russian: Кафедра экономической и социальной географии России) is one of the oldest and the largest Russian educational and research centers in economic geography and regional science

== History ==
The Department of Economic And Social Geography of Russia is a department of the geographical faculty in Moscow State University. It was founded in 1929 by Nikolay Baranskiy as a chair of economic geography on geographical branch of the mehaniko-mathematical faculty. Since 1992 it has been called the department of economic and social geography of Russia.

The first head of the department was its founder, N. Baranskiy, professor of the faculty and member-correspondent in Russian Academy of Sciences. Throughout its 80-year history the department has been headed by professor P. Stepanov (1941–1943; 1946–1949), Julian G. Saushkin (1349–1381), A. T. Khruschev (1981–2000), Vladimir E. Shuvalov (2000-2012) and V. Baburin (since July 2012).

Scientists of the chair have created a school of thought known as the Soviet Regional (Rayon) school of economic geography. Its theoretical bases have been made by professors Nikolay Baranskiy and Nikolay Kolosovskiy and were developed by J. Saushkin's works.

== Staff ==
The staff includes 6 doctors, 14 candidates of sciences, 6 professors, 9 senior lecturers, 1 assistant, 6 scientific employees and 5 leading engineers.

Professors:

- Evgeny Pertsik
- Vyacheslav Baburin
- Natalia Zubarevich
- Alexander Alekseev
- Alexander Pilyasov

== Specialization ==
- General questions of social and economic geography
- Economic geography
- Social geography
- Political geography
- Population and Geography of migration
- Geography of branches of key spheres of economy
- Wildlife management and the economic organization of territory
- Geourbanistics
- Regional problems of social and economic development
- Territorial planning, designing and management
- Regional policy

== Leading directions of scientific research ==
- Evolution of territorial organisation of society
- Transformation of social and economic space of Russia
- Social and economic development of regions of Russia and the new independent states
- Complex economic-geographical researches of regions
- Social and economic and environmental problems of development of cities
- Territorial planning and designing
- Territorial administration and self-management
- Theory and methodology of economic and social geography.

== See also ==
- MSU Faculty of Geography
