= Sergey Kapitsa =

Soviet and Russian physicist, TV host (1928–2012)

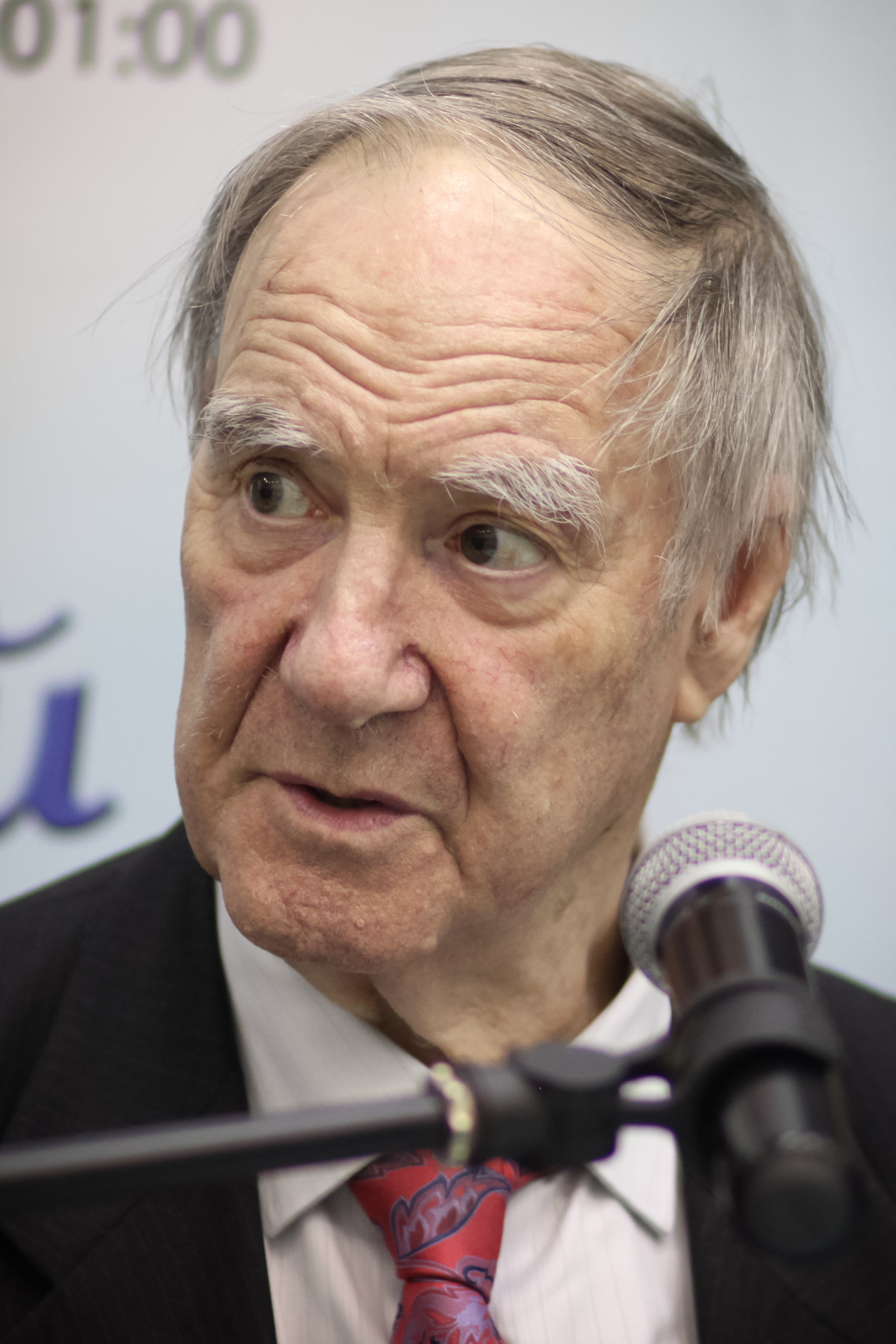
- Born: 14 February 1928; Cambridge, England
- Died: 14 August 2012 (aged 84); Moscow, Russian Federation
- Citizenship: Soviet, Russian, British
- Education: Moscow Aviation Institute
- Known for: TV science magazine host since 1973
- Awards: UNESCO's Kalinga Prize for the Popularization of Science, 1979 and USSR State Prize, 1980
- Scientific career
- Fields: Physics, demography
- Workplaces: Kapitza Institute for Physical Problems, RAS and Moscow Institute of Physics and Technology

Sergey Petrovich Kapitsa (Russian: Сергей Петрович Капица; 14 February 1928 – 14 August 2012) was a Russian physicist and demographer. He was best known as host of the popular and long-running Russian scientific TV show, Evident, but Incredible. His father was the Nobel laureate Soviet-era physicist Pyotr Kapitsa, and his brother was the geographer and Antarctic explorer Andrey Kapitsa.

== Life and career ==
Kapitsa was born in Cambridge, England, the son of Anna Alekseevna (Krylova) and Pyotr Kapitsa. His maternal grandfather was Aleksey Nikolaevich Krylov, naval engineer, applied mathematician and memoirist, and the developer of the insubmersibility technique. He was baptized while back in Britain, with Ivan Pavlov serving as his godparent. During his late life Kapitsa described himself as a "Russian Orthodox atheist".

In 1935 his family returned to the USSR. Kapitsa graduated from the Moscow Aviation Institute in 1949. He was Senior Research Fellow at the Lebedev Physical Institute, Russian Academy of Sciences and Professor at the Moscow Institute of Physics and Technology.

Kapitsa's contributions to physics were in the areas of applied electrodynamics and accelerator physics; he is known, in particular, for his work on the microtron, a device for producing electron beams. In later years, his research focus was on historical demography, where he developed a number of mathematical models of the World System population hyperbolic growth and the global demographic transition.

His activities in science popularization included hosting the Russian Television program, Evident, but Incredible, starting in 1973, for which he was awarded UNESCO's Kalinga Prize for the Popularization of Science in 1979 and the USSR State Prize in 1980, and editing the Russian edition of Scientific American from 1982 onwards. He was also active in issues of science and society through his participation in the Pugwash conferences and the Club of Rome. In the 1980s he, along with Carl Sagan, was outspoken about the possibility that international nuclear war would bring about a nuclear winter, making presentations in the US Senate in 1983 and the United Nations in 1985. He was an advocate of planetary exploration and served on the advisory council of the Planetary Society. In 2012, Kapitsa was awarded the first gold medal of the Russian Academy of Sciences for outstanding achievements in the dissemination of scientific knowledge.

Kapitsa was a pioneer of scuba diving in the Soviet Union, he shot the first underwater film about the Sea of Japan, which was shown at international film festivals, in particular in Cannes, where it was second only to the film by Jacques Cousteau.

Kapitsa was the vice president of the Russian Academy of Natural Sciences and president of the Eurasian Physical Society, and was a strong proponent of restoring support for science in Russia.

In 1992 the Committee for Skeptical Inquiry (CSICOP) presented Kapitsa with the Public Education in Science Award.

On 14 August 2012, Kapitsa died at the age of 84 in Moscow. He is remembered for his role in the popularisation of science and, after forty years of hosting Evident, but Incredible, holding the record for being the longest serving host of a TV programme.

== Views ==
In 2008 Kapitsa signed an open letter in defense of Svetlana Bakhmina.

During the late years Kapitsa was very critical of the state of the popular science and Russian television in general. In one of the last interviews he told about the closing of his TV program: "Channel One ordered me, first, to trash Soviet science, and, second, not to object against pseudoscience. I refused categorically. Then I was thrown out... They were cynical... The results of their political setups could be felt today: intellectual defeat of Russia, I can't find another word for their activity... TEFI would've never turned into a one-class dictatorship before. I didn't receive a single TEFI. Only in the past 2008, when Vladimir Posner had left, I was awarded one for "personal contribution to the development of Russian television"."

Kapitsa was fluent in Romanian and stated that Moldovans and Romanians are the same people.

== Memorialization ==
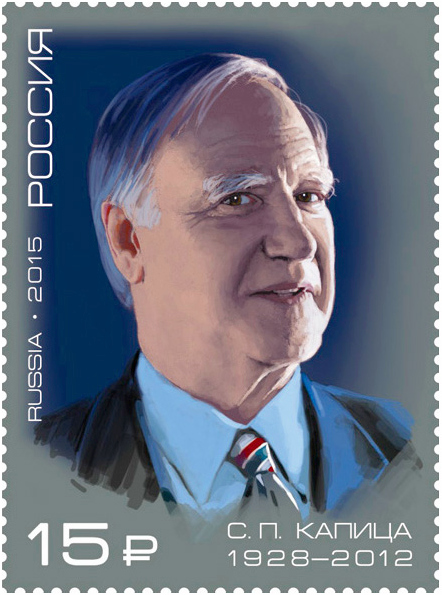
Sergei Kapitsa on a postage stamp in 2015

5094 Seryozha main-belt asteroid, discovered on 20 October 1982, was named in honor of Sergei Kapitsa.

On 5 March 2014 the President of the Russian Federation signed a decree "On memorialization of S. P. Kapitsa".

On February 12, 2015 the Publishing and Trading Centre Marka issued a commemorative postage stamp and a postmark with image of Sergei Kapitsa.

== Family ==
- Father – Pyotr Kapitsa, a leading Soviet physicist and Nobel Prize in Physics laureate, discoverer of superfluidity
- Mother – Anna Alekseevna Kapitsa (née Krylova)
- Maternal grandfather – Aleksey Nikolaevich Krylov, naval engineer, applied mathematician and memoirist, developer of insubmersibility technique
- Younger brother – Andrey Kapitsa, geographer, credited with the discovery and naming of Lake Vostok, the largest subglacial lake in Antarctica, which lies 4,000 metres (13,000 ft) below the continent's ice cap
- Wife – Tatiana Alimovna Damir (since 1949)
  - Son – Fyodor Kapitsa (ru) (1950–2017), Russian philologist, folklorist and writer
  - Daughter – Maria (1954), psychologist at the Moscow State University
  - Daughter – Varvara (1960), a doctor
