= Shipbuilding in Russia =

Russian shipbuilding industry

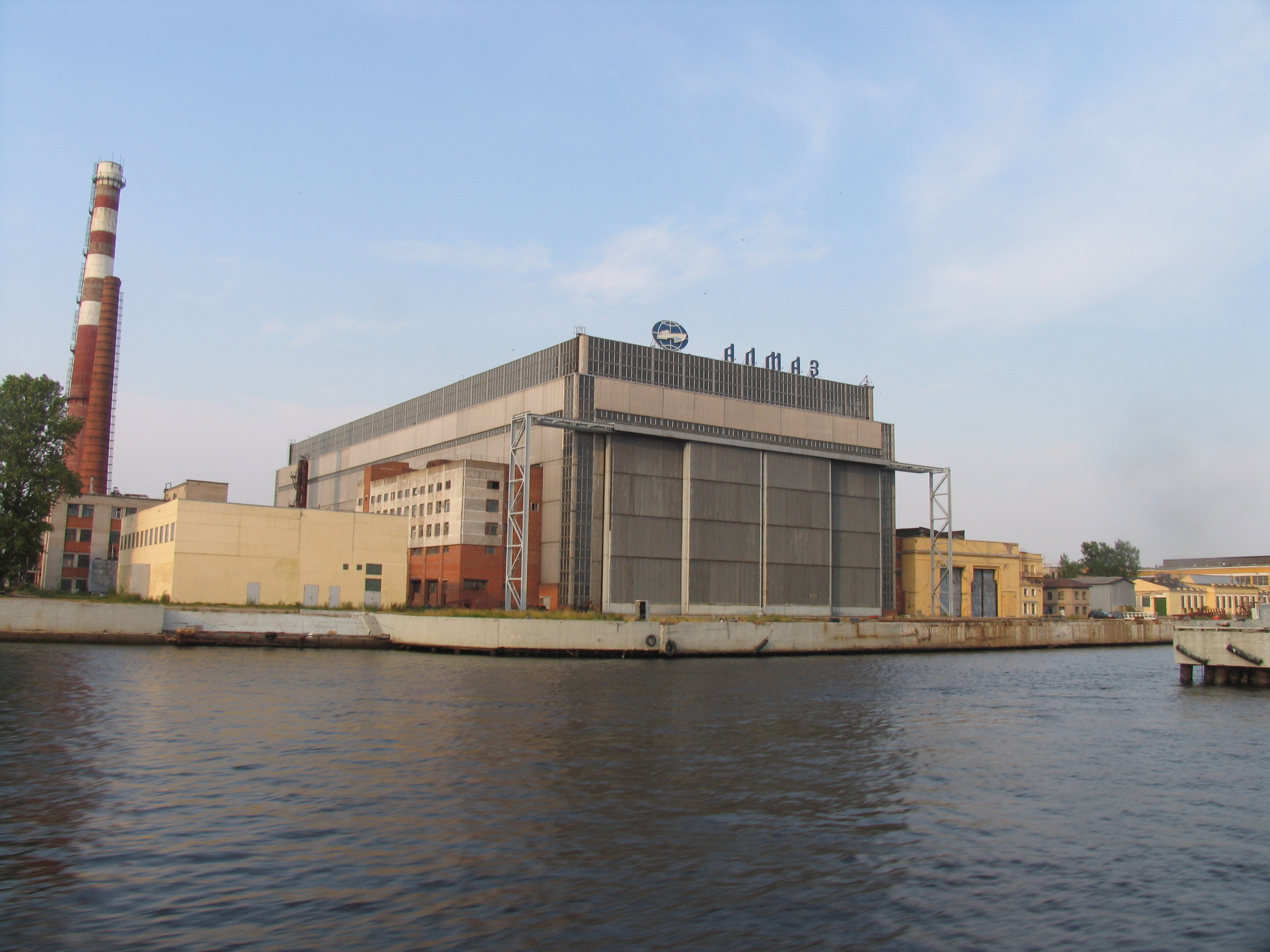
Almaz Shipbuilding Company plant in Saint Petersburg

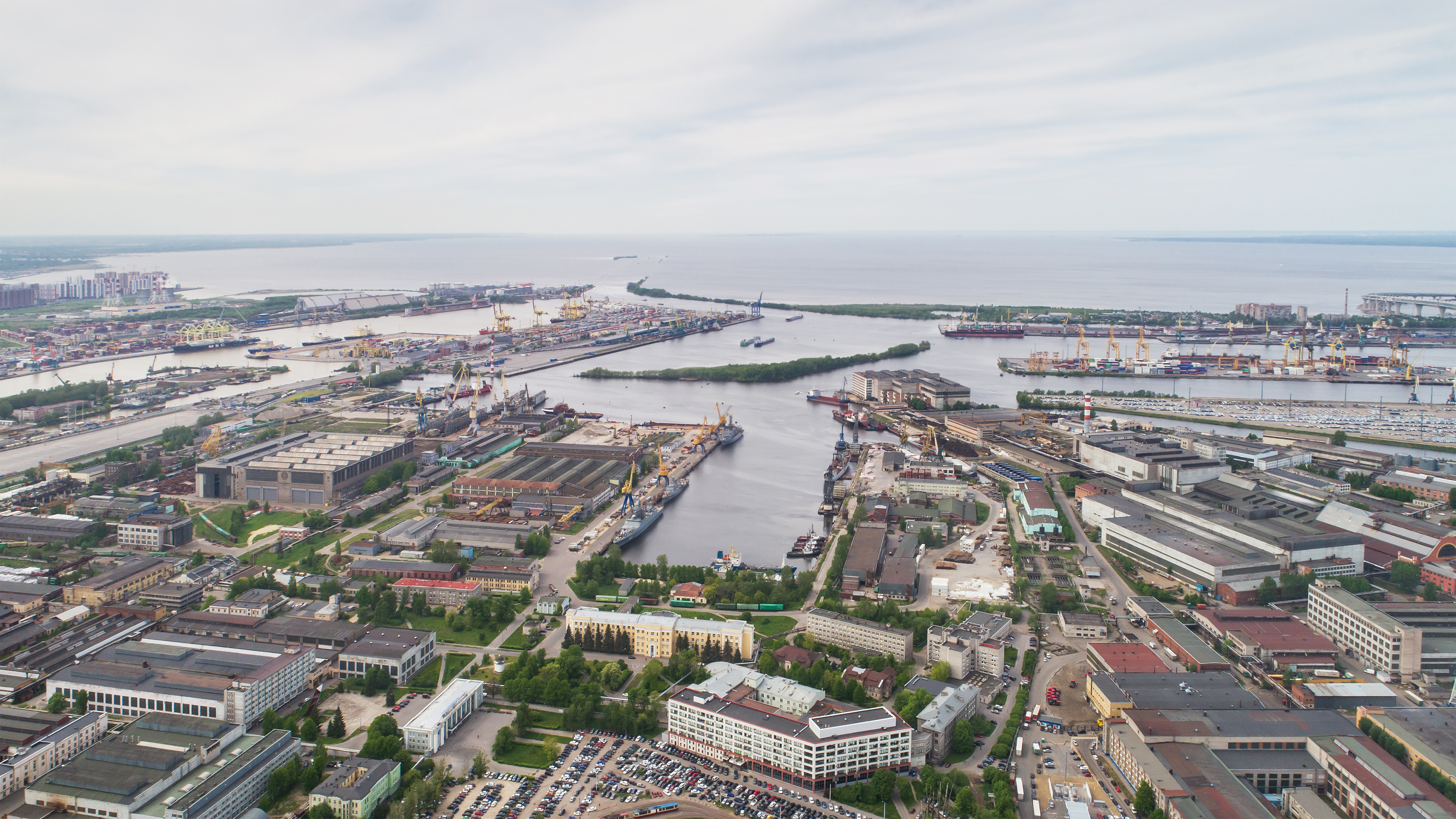
Severnaya Verf in Saint Petersburg

Shipbuilding is an established industry in Russia and is considered strategically important to both the country's armed forces and national economy.

== Recent history ==
Russia's shipbuilding industry struggled in the post-Soviet era, with few ships completed between 1990 and 2010. Russia has had difficulty modernizing its shipbuilding industry and ship designs, due in part to economic sanctions and budget constraints, but has strengths in submarine and cruise missile development.

In October 2006, the government approved a short-term industry plan, the Complex Program to Advance Production of the Shipbuilding Industry on the Market between 2008 and 2015. It envisaged the establishment of a scientific centre at the Krylov Institute, two engineering centres, and three shipbuilding centres: the Western, Northern and Far Eastern Centers. The main long-term plan in 2007 was the "Strategy for developing the shipbuilding industry until 2020 and beyond". In 2010, Russia created new strategic plans to update and improve its fleet, while facing supply chain problems and other issues.

In 2025, the Government of Russia said it had built 49 ships over the previous five years. It announced plans to build 1,637 additional ships by 2036, including ships suitable for the Northern Sea Route and the International North–South Transport Corridor, such as oil tankers and ice class vessels.

== Shipyards ==
=== Included United Shipbuilding Corporation (state corporation) ===
==== Western region (center in St. Petersburg) ====
Name	Location	Year of foundation	Types of vessels	
33-rd factory ships repair	Baltiysk	1889	ship repair	
Vyborg Shipyard	Vyborg	1948	trial of high complexity, drilling platforms for the development of offshore marine, ships small and medium tonnage	
Baltic Shipyard "Yantar"	Kaliningrad	1945	combat and civilian vessels	
Factory "Krasnoye Sormovo"	Nizhny Novgorod	1849	court civil fleet. hardware modules for shelf development, rescue submersibles	
Almaz Shipbuilding Company	Saint Petersburg	1933	Ships and hovercraft, patrol boats, special purpose ships, sailing and motor yachts, speedboats	
Admiralty Shipyard	Saint Petersburg	1704	submarines, cargo ships, boats	
Baltic Shipyard	Saint Petersburg	1856	warships, heavy civilian ships for transportation of various goods, icebreakers (with nuclear power plants and diesel)	
Proletarsky zavod (Proletarian factory)	Saint Petersburg	1826	marine equipment	
Sredne-Nevskiy Shipyard	Pontoon village, Kolpinsky District, Saint Petersburg	1912	missile boats (corvettes), mine countermeasures ships, patrol ships, work and passenger ships	
Severnaya Verf	Saint Petersburg	1912	frigates, corvettes, cargo ships, supply vessels offshore drilling platforms, repair	
Kronstadt Naval Plant & Novoadmiralty Verf' STX (planned construction)	Kronstadt	1858	ship repair (Novoadmiralty STX = military up to high dwt (150 k ton ?) icebreakers and oil gas related)	
"Pella" shipyard	Saint Petersburg	1950	Pella holding	tugs, pilot boats, boats, other vessels
Svetlyy enterprise "ERA"	Svetly, Kaliningrad Oblast	1969	electrical work on ships, repair, installation, commissioning and testing of the ship's electrical and power distribution equipment manufacturer	
Kriushinsky Shipyard	Kriushi village, Novoulyanovsk	1975	shipbuilding and ship repair	
Plant "Nizhny Novgorod ship"	Bor, Nizhny Novgorod Oblast	1911	ships and auxiliary fleet	
Moscow shipbuilding and ship repair facility	Moscow	1933	yachts, river passenger ships, marker vessels, boats	

==== Northern Region (center in Severodvinsk) ====
Name	Location	Year of foundation	Types of vessels
Arkhangelsk branch "176th factory ship repair"	Arkhangelsk	1949	ship repair
35th factory ship repair	Murmansk	1938	comprehensive repairs ships of the Navy
82nd factory ship repair	Murmansk	1947	repairing of ships (including submarines and icebreakers with nuclear power plant)
Base fleet maintenance	Murmansk	1959	ship repair
10th Order of the Red Banner of Labour factory ship repair	Polyarny, Murmansk Oblast	1935	ship repair
Ship Repair Centre "Zvyozdochka"	Severodvinsk	1946	repair, modernization and refurbishment of nuclear submarines, dismantlement of nuclear submarines, manufacture of propellers, construction of civil vessels
Production association "Sevmash"	Severodvinsk	1939	nuclear submarines, tugs, cargo ships
Shipyard "Nerpa"	Snezhnogorsk, Murmansk Oblast	1966	repair, maintenance and disposal of nuclear submarines of the Northern Fleet of the Russian Navy

==== Far East Region (center in Vladivostok) ====
Name	Location	Year of foundation	Types of vessels
Dalnevstochny zavod "Zvezda" (Far East Plant "Zvezda"), Zvezda DSME	Bolshoy Kamen	1954	warships of any class, repair and refurbishment of nuclear/diesel submarines, disposal of nuclear submarines; icebreakers, oil platform drilling and LNG and oil tankers (plant under development)
Northeast Repair Center	Vilyuchinsk	1957	repair of nuclear and diesel submarines, surface ships, auxiliary vessels, weapons nomenclature ground forces and air defense, disposal of nuclear submarines
Ship Repair Center "Dalzavod"	Vladivostok	2012 (merger of the holding company "Dalzavod" and 178th ship repair plant)	repair of surface ships and submarines (currently closed for plant modernization)
Vostochnij Verf	Vladivostok	(Vladivostok Shipbuilding Plant until 1994)	Boats Ships
92nd Order of the Red Banner of Labour factory ship repair	Vladivostok		ship repair
Vostok-Raffles (joint venture United Shipbuilding Corporation and CIMC Raffles Offshore (Singapore) Limited (Singapore)	Vladivostok	2010	drilling platforms ice breakers LNG oil platform drilling and tankers (now the plant is under planned construction)
30th factory ship repair	Dunay, Primorsky Krai		repair of warships
Amur Shipbuilding Plant	Komsomolsk-on-Amur	1936	cargo ships, fishing boats, special vessels
Khabarovsk plant marine engineering of A. Gorky	Khabarovsk	1946	marine electrical and hydraulic winches and kranoy small and medium-duty trucks, ejector pumps, marine heat exchangers, hydraulic feeder cargo on deck, tools, jigs and fixtures for the civil courts and Navy ships
Khabarovsk Shipyard	Khabarovsk	1953	boats for various purposes, passenger ships, fishing trawlers, refrigerators, barges, boats, support vessels for the fleet (tugs, bunkering, oil skimmers, pontoons, vessels pads), multipurpose hovercraft amphibious type and transport hovercraft for the oil and gas industry

==== Central Region ====
Name	Location	Year of foundation	Types of vessels
Shipyard "Vympel"	Rybinsk	1930	medium-and low-tonnage sea and river vessels, civil and military boats
Yaroslavsky Shipyard	Yaroslavl	1920	small anti-submarine and patrol boats, speed boats for different purposes with a displacement of 10 to 100 tons, amphibious patrol and amphibious hovercraft, support vessels for emergency service fleet displacement of up to 1,400 tons, river and sea speed passenger vessels up to 150 people, conservation and fishing boats, river tankers for oil and edible fats floating pumping stations, ships, leisure and tourism
Lazurit Shipbuilding Plant & Krasnoje Sormovo	Nizhny Novgorod		Ships Boats and Submarines
Zelenodolsky Plant. A. M. Gorky	Zelenodolsk	1895	ships and special purpose ships; Court of goods by sea, river, sea-river, lake, other steel; high-speed passenger vessels of light alloys, hydrofoils, planing vessels

==== Southern Region ====
Name	Location	Year of foundation	Types of vessels
Shipyard "Lotus"	Narimanov, Astrakhan Oblast	1978	block topside modules of fixed offshore platforms designed for drilling and production of oil and gas on the continental shelf seas, cargo ships
AstraSZ, Krasnje Barrikady, MSSZ2 and other Shipbuilding Plants	Astrakhan		
Azovskaya SudoVerf' (new)	Azov	2018 - 2024	various ships and oil gas tankers and arctic ships
Novorossiysk factory ship repair	Novorossiysk	1918	repair of sea and river vessels
5th factory ship repair	Temryuk	1982	ship repairing
Tuapse factory ship repair	Tuapse	1934	ship repairing

==== Design Bureau ====
Name	Location	Year of foundation	Scope
Design bureau "Astramarin"	Astrakhan	2002	Perform design work on projects for hydrocarbon exploration and production offshore the Russian Federation and the Caspian region
Research institute "Bereg"	Vladivostok	1976	development of ship-borne instruments
Far East Design Institute "Vostokproektverf"	Vladivostok	1948	development projects of shipbuilding and ship repair plants
Zelenodolskoye Design Bureau	Zelenodolsk, Russia	1949	design of ships and vessels, as well as support their construction, development projects of modernization, advice and assistance in the design, experiment and test, design and manufacture of marine engineering
Scientific and Production Association "Screw"	Moscow (design bureau), Borovsk (pilot plant)	1946	creation and testing of all types of experimental marine propulsion, both for the Navy and for the national economy
Special Design and Technological Bureau of Design and Technology Bureau electrochemistry with experimental plant	Moscow	1941	An electrochemical regeneration system of automatic control of the air and the composition of the atmosphere in the living encapsulated objects, electrochemical generators of hydrogen and oxygen with different performance, electrochemical oxygen concentrators and carbon dioxide, electrochemical power sources, technology producing, purifying, storing and transporting hydrogen, including the extra-pure hydrogen, termosorbtsionnye hydrogen compressors of various capacities, medium and high pressure
Design bureau "Vimpel"	Nizhny Novgorod	1927	design for all requirements, including foreign ones, classification societies and technical maintenance of the vessels of various types and purposes
Central Design Bureau for Hydrofoil them. R.E. Alekseeva	Nizhny Novgorod	1951	development of ground effect vehicle, hydrofoils, hovercraft, boats
Northern Design Bureau	Saint Petersburg	1946	design surface warships (cruisers, destroyers, frigates, corvettes and boats)
Design bureau Krylov	Saint Petersburg		
St. Petersburg Naval Machinery Bureau "Malachite" Academician N.N. Isanina	Saint Petersburg	1948	drafting submarines
Rubin Design Bureau	Saint Petersburg	1926	designing submarines as diesel-electric and nuclear
Central Design Bureau "Iceberg"	Saint Petersburg	1947	designing powerful icebreakers for Arctic icebreaking cargo ships, multipurpose icebreakers-procurers for offshore oil, multipurpose offshore vessels and supply vessels offshore oil, floating bases for technical and general service vessels with nuclear power plants, port icebreakers, research and hydrographic vessels
Central Marine Design Bureau "Almaz"	Saint Petersburg	1949	designing high-speed boats, surface ships small and medium displacement, amphibious hovercraft, ship anti-mine defense, as well as ships and special purpose ships and floating docks
Research Design and Technological Bureau "Onega"	Severodvinsk	1975	Technological and design software repair, recovery and conversion of technical readiness of nuclear submarines, diesel-electric submarines and surface ships

=== Other ===
Name	Location	Year of foundation	Parent company	Types of vessels
Novoladozhsky Shipyard	Novaya Ladoga	1940		river-sea vessels up to 100 meters long, boats, yachts, including aluminum alloys
Nevsky shipbuilding and ship repair plant	Schlisselburg	1913	North-Western Shipping Company	tankers, freighters, tugs, office-crew boats, ships technical fleet and fleet software
Kostroma Marine Engineering Plant	Kostroma	1934		River boats of KS
Volgograd Shipyard	Volgograd	1931		seiners trawlers, oil tankers, chemical tankers and bulk carriers for different purposes for river, mixed "river-sea", marine and sailing conditions
Shipbuilding and ship repair plant them. Butyakova C. H	Zvenigovo	1860	Pushers, service-crew boats (motor yacht)	
Azov Shipyard	Azov	1928		small boats and yachts for individual orders, oil waste collection vessels, dredgers
Commercial center Sudomarket	Primorsko-Akhtarsk	1962	Group Doninflot	Fishing vessels, tugs, dive boats, oil skimmer, floating rigs, semi-submersible drilling rigs, directors booms, buoys
Oka shipyard	Navashino	1907	Universal Cargo Logistics Holding	oil tankers and dry cargo vessels of medium mixed swimming; container ships, special vessels, barges
Sosnovka Shipyard	Sosnovka, Kirov Oblast	1924	boats, hovercraft	
Akhtubinsky shipbuilding and ship repair plant	Akhtubinsk	1910	Vega group of companies	barges, docks, dredgers; repairing of ships
Nakhodka ship repair plant	Nakhodka	1951		ship repairing
Sakhalinremflot	Kholmsk	1949	ship repairing	
Shipyard "Volga"	Nizhny Novgorod	1970	Russian financial-industrial groups (FIGs) "Speed Ships"	hydrofoils (passenger ships, cargo ships, salvage ships, patrol boats, boats for recreation)
Redan	Saint Petersburg	1901	Russian financial-industrial groups (FIGs) "Speed Ships"	planing boats
Svir Shipyard	township Nikolsky, Podporozhsky District, Leningrad Oblast	1940	Russian financial-industrial groups (FIGs) "Speed Ships"	boats and hovercraft, concrete floating pontoons
Krasnoyarsk shipyard	Krasnoyarsk	1929		shallow-draft vessels for small rivers
AKS-Invest	Nizhny Novgorod	1991		amphibious passenger hovercraft types Mars-700M, Mars-702, TA-33 and Mars-3000, water-jet boat cruise Transal, water-jet passenger boats Irtysh, water-jet cargo boat refrigerator Pelikan, sea cruise hydrofoils Sokol, jetskis Flagman, sea water jet multi-purpose boat Jupiter
Aerohod	Nizhny Novgorod	1999		amphibious hovercraft types Khivus-3, Khivus-4, Khivus-6, Khivus-10

== See also ==
- Icebreakers of Russia
- List of shipyards of the Soviet Union
- List of Russian naval engineers
- Defense industry of Russia
- Russian Navy
- Russian floating nuclear power station
