= Nikolay Baransky =

Soviet geographer (1881–1963)

- Born: Nikolay Nikolayevich Baransky; 27 July [O.S. 15 July] 1881; Tomsk, Tomsk Governorate, Russian Empire
- Died: 29 November 1963 (aged 82); Moscow, Russian SFSR, Soviet Union
- Resting place: Novodevichy Cemetery
- Known for: founder of Soviet Rayon (Regional) school of economic geography
- Scientific career
- Fields: Economic geography
- Institutions: Department of Economic And Social Geography of Russia MSU Faculty of Geography
- Notable students: Georgy Lappo

Nikolay Nikolayevich Baransky (Russian: Николай Николаевич Баранский; 27 July [O.S. 15 July] 1881 – 29 November, 1963) was a Soviet economic geographer, founder of Soviet Rayon (Regional) school of economic geography, and corresponding member of Soviet Academy of Sciences (1939); he was a Hero of Socialist Labour (1962) and winner of the Stalin Prize (1952).

== Biography ==
Nikolay Baransky was born in Tomsk into the family of a teacher. In 1898 he joined Russian Social Democratic Labour Party (RSDLP). In 1899 he graduated from grammar school with a gold medal and entered law department of Tomsk University. During his studies, he continued to be engaged in public work. In 1901 he was excluded from university for participation in a student demonstration. Soon after that, he wrote his first geographical work, concerning the property stratification of immigrants in the villages of the Barnaul district (published in 1907).

In 1902 joined Siberian social-democratic group, which later joined the Siberian Social-Democratic Union–RSDLP Committee. In 1906–08 he was engaged in revolutionary activity, has been three times arrested, long time was in custody. After release from prison, he left party and lived in Ufa. In years 1910-1914 Baransky studied at economic branch of Moscow commercial institute. After graduation, he worked in the Zemgor committee. In 1917 he joined the ranks of Menshevik-Internationalists (in 1920 he became a Bolshevik).

In 1919-20 he worked in Supreme Soviet of the National Economy.

Baransky led research in areas of regional economic geography and geography of cities. Baransky is the author of several textbooks on economic geography of the USSR for high schools, works on social and economic geography and economic cartography.

Nikolay Baransky was awarded three Orders of Lenin, two other orders and medals. He died in Moscow, and is buried on Novodevichy Cemetery. In Tomsk, memorial plaque is placed on the house where he lived. Volcano on Iturup island and street in Alma-Ata are named in his honour.

== Teaching and scientific activity ==
- In 1920–21 he taught at the Siberian higher party school, in 1921 has moved to Moscow where he taught in a number of educational institutions:
- 1921–29 – the Higher party school
- 1927–30 – 2nd Moscow university, professor, chair of economic geography founded by S. V. Bernstein-Koganom
- 1929 – Baransky has organized Department of economic geography of the USSR at Moscow State University geographical faculty, was its manager in 1929–1941 and 1943–1946
- 1933–38 professor at Institute of the world economy and world politics. Chair of economic geography
- 1936–40 professor in 2nd Moscow State University, Chair of economic geography

In 1939 Baransky was elected corresponding member of Academy of Sciences of the Soviet Union. In 1946 he was nominated for election to full member of Soviet Academy of Sciences, but refused the nomination and supported Lev Berg.

Under the direction of Baransky, Soviet regional school became dominating in the field in the Soviet economic geography. Baransky authored several textbooks on economic geography of the USSR for high schools, works on social and economic geography and economic cartography.

== Honours and awards ==
- Hero of Socialist Labour, the Order of Lenin and the gold medal "Hammer and Sickle" (Decree of the Presidium of the Supreme Soviet, 28 March 1962) – for outstanding achievements in the development of economic geography
- Three Orders of Lenin (1946, 1953, 1962)
- Order of the Red Banner of Labour (1945)
- Order of the Badge of Honour (1940)
- Honoured Scientist of RSFSR (1943)
- Stalin Prize (1952)
- Gold Medal of PP Semenov-Tyan-Shan-Union Geographical Society (1951).

== Works ==
- Economic geography of the USSR: the review on State Planning Committee areas. М; Л: Giza, 1926
- the Short course of economic geography. М; Л: Giza, 1928.
- Geography of the USSR: the Textbook for high school. М: Учпедгиз, 1933.
- Economic geography of the USA.: p. 1: the General review. – М: Institute of the international. Relations, 1946.
- the Historical review of textbooks of geography (1876–1934). М: Географгиз, 1954.
- Economic geography in high school. Economic geography in the higher school: Сб. Articles. – М: Географгиз, 1957.
- Economic geography. Economic cartography. – М: Географгиз, 1960.
- the Technique of teaching of economic geography. M.:Учпедгиз, 1960.

== See also ==
- Department of Economic And Social Geography of Russia
- MSU Faculty of Geography
- Nikolay Kolosovsky
