= Institute of Geography of the Russian Academy of Sciences =

Soviet-Russian research institute

- Институт географии РАН
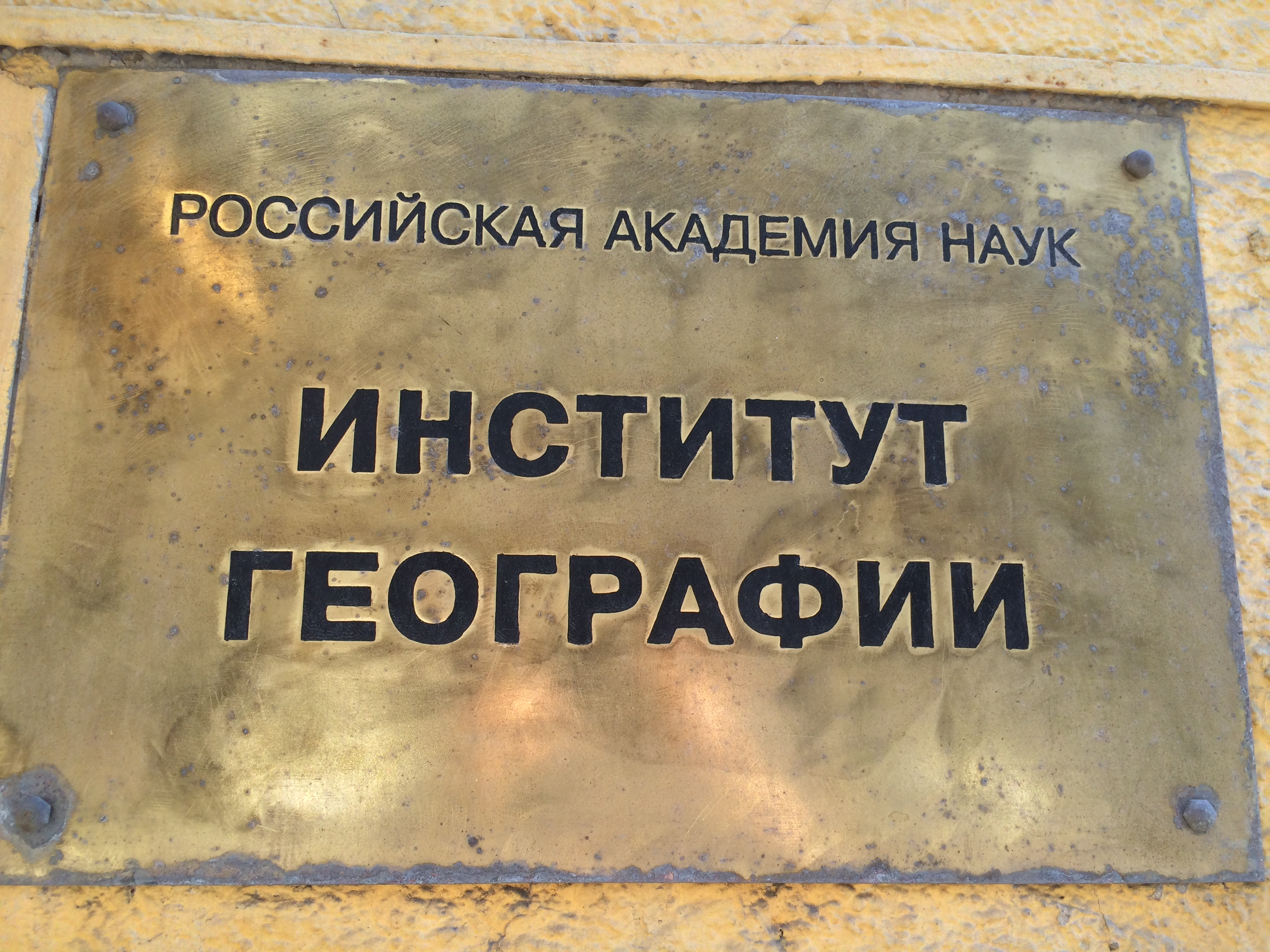
- Type: Public
- Established: 1930; 96 years ago
- Location: 29 Staromonetny pereulok, Moscow, Russia; 55°44′19″N 37°37′12″E
- Website: igras.ru

The Institute of Geography of the Russian Academy of Sciences (Russian: Институт географии РАН); abbreviated IGRAN (Russian: ИГРАН), is an academic geographical institute of the Russian Academy of Sciences, part of the Department of Earth Sciences (section of oceanology, atmospheric physics and geography). It is engaged in identifying patterns of interaction between nature and society in the context of global environmental change. Priority research includes: cryosphere dynamics, natural and anthropogenic dynamics of biota, soils, relief and landscapes, development of scientific foundations for nature conservation, regional features of sustainable development, geoinformation technologies and mapping.

== History ==
=== Background ===
In 1918, the Department of Industrial and Geographical Study of the Central Russia of the Commission for the Study of the Natural Productive Forces of the Country (KEPS) of the Russian Academy of Sciences was created in Petrograd. Economic, economic-geographical and complex (since 1921) studies were conducted.

In 1925, it was reorganized into the Department of Industrial and Geographical Study of the Central Russia of the Commission for the Study of the Natural Productive Forces of the Country of the Soviet Academy of Sciences. In 1926, the Geographical Department of the Commission for the Study of the Natural Productive Forces of the Country (KEPS of the USSR Academy of Sciences) was created.

== Incorporation of the Institute ==
In 1930, the Geomorphological Institute (GEOMIN) of the Council for the Study of Productive Forces was created. In 1934 it was renamed the Institute of Physical Geography (IFG SOPS USSR Academy of Sciences). The processes and types of natural environment were studied.

In 1936, with the merger of the Communist Academy with the Academy of Sciences of the Soviet Union, the Institute of Geography of the Council for the Study of Productive Forces of the USSR Academy of Sciences was created. Methodological studies were conducted: economic-geographical, resource, regional studies, and regional studies by industry. Theoretical, applied scientific (expeditionary and stationary); restoration of international scientific cooperation. Expeditions to areas of promising economic development: the North, Western Siberia, Central Siberia, Transbaikalia, the Far East, Pamir, Central Asia, Kazakhstan.

During the Great Patriotic War, the institute was engaged in military geography and regional studies. Military-geographical maps, descriptions of front-line areas were prepared, optimal placement of evacuated enterprises was developed, research into agro-climatic, land and labor resources was conducted. Maintenance of combat operations and rear economy. Expeditions to the east and south of the USSR and to temporarily occupied territories.

Restoration of the economy and creation of new territorial-production complexes in the Soviet Union — applied resource, regional studies, general theoretical research: design of territorial-production complexes; natural and economic-geographical zoning; industry academic research in geomorphology, climatology, glaciology, biogeography; natural-historical zoning. theoretical and applied research; expeditions; organization of stationary stations and a network of geographical institutions in the Soviet Union; training of local personnel. Expeditions to the east and to socialist countries.

=== Institute of Geography of the Soviet Academy of Sciences ===
In 1960, the institute was renamed the Institute of Geography of the Academy of Sciences of the Soviet Union. During the period of economic development and transformation of nature, constructive geography was formed, fundamental and applied research was conducted in the industry, and new international scientific ties were established. Research on the environment, economy, and resources began. Coordination of geographical science in the Soviet Union, international cooperation with the CMEA countries, and the organization of congresses were carried out.

Since 1985, the organization of interdisciplinary links and specialization of industry research has been outlined. Inventory of resources, environmental research, participation in international programs.

=== Institute of Geography of the Russian Academy of Sciences ===
At the end of December 1991, it was renamed into the modern Institute of Geography of the Russian Academy of Sciences (IGRAS). The institute is developing geoinformation geography. Research is conducted on territorial development, diversity of nature and society, and serial applied and fundamental research. Cooperation with the Russian Geographical Society is expanding.

In 2019, the institute opened the Faculty of Geography and Geoinformation Technologies at the Higher School of Economics.

== Directors ==
Director of the institute:

- 1918-1923 - Mikhail Bogolepov, Head of the Department of Industrial and Geographical Studies of Russia at the KEPS of the Russian Academy of Sciences.
- 1923-1956 - Andrey Aleksandrovich Grigoryev, Head of the Geographical Department of the Soviet Academy of Sciences (1927), the Geomorphological Institute (1930), the Institute of Physical Geography (1934).
- 1956-1985 - Innokenti Gerasimov
- 1985-1987 - Grigory Avsyuk
- 1987-2015 - Vladimir Kotlyakov
- 2015 - Olga Solomina
