= Viktor Kozin =

Victor Kozin
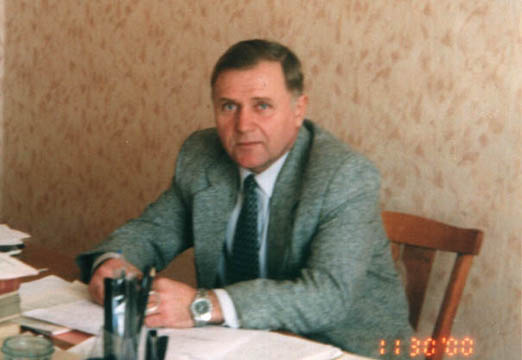
- Professor Viktor Kozin
- Born: February 22, 1953; Sita, Khabarovsky Kray, Russia
- Citizenship: Russia
- Education: KnATI
- Scientific career
- Fields: shipbuilding, mechanics, applied mathematics, inventor, theoretical physics
- Workplaces: KnAGTU KnAGPU

Notes
- facebook.com/viktor.kozin http://www.icebreaking.info/

Viktor Mikhailovich Kozin (Russian: Козин, Виктор Михайлович) (born February 22, 1953) is a Russian naval engineer, ship designer and inventor of a new method of icebreaking, called the resonance method of ice destruction. He received his assistant professorship in technical sciences (PhD) for his work Mechanics of deformable solids in Vladivostok in 1994. He became a full professor in 1996 and was awarded the title Honored Inventor of the Russian Federation in 2000. Since 2008 he has been a member of the Russian Academy of Natural Sciences (RANS).

Kozin was awarded a diploma from the president of the Russian Academy of Sciences (1999) and won grants from the Russian Ministry of Education (2006). He received multiple prizes for his academic and scientific achievements in the theory of watercraft statics and dynamics, design of vessels, hydraulics and hydromechanics, ship and submarine construction. He is the author of two textbooks in naval engineering and twelve works on the methods of education in the area of naval design.

With the direct participation of Victor Kozin construction was completed the towing basin (45x4,2x4m), Komsomolsk-on-Amur State Technical University.

== Accomplishments ==
Kozin has authored just over 500 publications, including 18 publications of the Higher Attestation Commission of the Ministry of Education and Science of the Russian Federation. He has made 35 presentations at international conferences, published eight monographs, and is the owner of more than 320 patents for inventions.

== Prepared ==
Ph.D.: Zhyostkaya V.D.; Onischuk A.V.; Baranov E.V.; Morozov V.S.; Zemlyak V.L.; Dzhabrailov M.R.

== Basic activities ==
External videos
- Resonance method of ice destruction part 1 of 2 (icebreaking by resonance) on YouTube
- Resonance method of ice destruction part 2 of 2 (icebreaking by resonance) on YouTube

- Research opportunities resonance method of ice destruction, congestion and hanging ice dams.
- Using fusible substances for automatic balancing of traffic congestion.
- Development of new technologies and devices for cleaning hard pavements of ice and snow rolling.
- Using the power expansion of ice for kolibrovki zigovki and thin-walled tubes.
- Develop technologies to improve the bearing capacity of ice, use-forming as the ice crossings and the load-carrying platforms.

== Awarded ==
- Honored inventor of the Russian Federation (2000)
- For the development of inventions in Russia by the Presidium of RANS awarded the medal. Alfred Nobel (2007)
- Winner of first prize at the competition of the Governor of Khabarovsk Krai for university professors (2009)
- Three silver medals at the competition "Archimedes", dedicated to the 100th anniversary of the latest inventions in Russia (Sankt-Peterburg. March 2009)
- Two silver and one bronze medal at 1X Moscow International Salon of Innovations and Investments (Moscow, August 2009)
- Silver medal at the St. Petersburg Technical Fair (St. Petersburg, March 2010).
- Silver Medal at the Tenth International Salon of Innovations and Investments (Moscow, August 2010).
- Bronze Medal XIV Moscow International Salon of inventions and innovative technologies "Archimedes - 2011" (Moscow, 2011)
- Gold Medal XIV Moscow International Salon of inventions and innovative technologies "Archimedes - 2011" (Moscow, 2011)

== Developed ==
- Developed and implemented the practice of the resonance method of ice destruction, implemented by the courts amphibious hovercraft that can many times lower power compared to conventional technologies (application crust of ice crystals, ice-breaker boxes, etc.)
- A technique for estimating icebreaking qualities under-water vessels. deplete the ice by a resonance method in their ascent to the PA-kovom ice. Received depending on the evaluation of the bearing capacity of ice when it is used as an avtozimnikov, ice crossings and the runways during emergency landings.
  The design, which increase the carrying ability of the ice. exploited as load-carrying platforms.
- Improved technology for ice for transportation to prevent accidents, in particular, as modes of movement of vehicles and devices that increase the capacity of ice at its dynamic loading.
  patented technology and developed a design, allowing more efficient than existing technologies to destroy the ice cover in the elimination of congestion and hanging ice dams on the rivers during periods of icy conditions and drifting.
- Improve the technology of explosive works to prevent the complications of ice on the inland waterways, causing devastating floods.
  Through the use of low-melting substances (Wood's metal) has developed methods and devices for automatic balancing of rotors, protected by several patents of the Russian Federation on the invention.
- Proposed a theory and a device for cleaning hard pavement of snow and ice runup. Developed solutions allow sparing coating mode to clear the road several times more efficient than existing designs and technologies.

== Books and Monographs ==
- Zuev VA, Kozin VM Using hovercraft to break ice / Vladivostok .. - M.: Far Eastern State University, 1988. - S. 128. - ISBN 5-8044-0384-2
- Kozin, VM Shepel VT and other project analysis of appropriate operation of vessels with a small area of the waterline in the Far Eastern basin. - M.: Preprint: Vladivostok, IMM RAS, 1991. - S. 48.
- Kozin, VM Shepel VT and other advanced surface and underwater facilities of Ocean Development of the Far Eastern basin. - M.: Preprint: Vladivostok, IMM RAS, 1992. - S. 54.
- Kozin, VM Shepel VT and other features of the design and operation of icebreaking ships on air cushion. - M.: Preprint: Vladivostok, IMM RAS, 1992. - S. 63.
- Rigid VD, Kozin, VM, Investigation of the possibility of ice cover destruction amphibious ships on air cushion. - M.: Dal'nauka, 2003. - S. 161. - ISBN 5-8044-0384-2
- Kozin, VM, Nicolay G. Povsyk, Shport VI Ledorazrushayuschaya ability flexural-gravity waves on the motion of objects. - M.: Dal'nauka, 2005. - S. 191. - ISBN 5-8044-0508-X
- Kozin, VM, Marin BN et al. Gidrogazovye system aircraft (Tutorial). - M.: Dal'nauka, 2006. - S. 459. - ISBN 5-8044-0057-6
- Sharlaimov VI, Kozin, VM, Experimental studies of transients in the motion of a continuous medium in a gravitational field. - Moscow: The Academy of Natural Sciences, 2007. - S. 232C. - ISBN 5-98654-025-5
- Kozin, VM, Nicolay G. Povsyk, Shport VI Applied problems in the dynamics of ice cover. - Moscow: The Academy of Natural Sciences, 2008. - S. 329. - ISBN 978-5-91327-019-1
- Kozin, VM Resonance method of destruction of ice cover. Inventions and Experiments .. - Moscow: The Academy of Natural Sciences, 2007. - S. 355. - ISBN 978-5-91327-017-7
- Kozin, VM The possibility of using low-melting substances for automatic rotor balancing .. - Moscow: The Academy of Natural Sciences, 2009. - S. 231. - ISBN 978-5-91327-035-1
