= Nikolay Kolosovsky =

Soviet economist and geographer

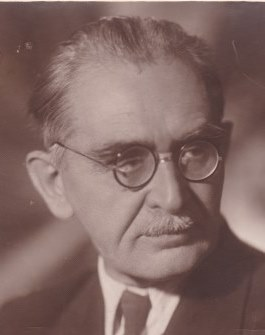
Nikolay Kolosovsky

Nikolay Kolosovskiy (19 September 1891 – 25 November 1954) was a Russian and Soviet economic geographer and economist, one of founders of the Soviet Rayon (Regional) school of economic geography.

== Biography ==
Kolosovskiy was born in a family of Nizhny Novgorod Fair employee. In 1916, he graduated from Petersburg University of Means of Communication and worked at construction of railways in Transbaikal region.

In the years 1921–1931, he worked in Gosplan where was engaged in division of USSR into economic districts, working out of schemes of studying and development of resources of Siberia and the Far East (Uralo-Kuznetsk industrial complex, the Trans-Siberian superhighway, Angarostroi).

In the years 1931–1936, Kolosovskiy worked in Hydroproject, where he developed the project of power-industrial complex at Angara river. In the years 1936–46, he worked in Soviet Academy of Sciences. During World War II he supervised war industries expansion in Ural, and decision of the transport problems connected with it. He was awarded the Stalin Prize in 1942.

== Scientific and teaching activity ==
After the end of war, Kolosovsky concentrated on teaching. He was the Professor of Department of Economic And Social Geography of Russia MSU Faculty of Geography, where he taught from 1931. He also taught at Plekhanov Institute of the National Economy. It was where the author's course of lectures on economic division into districts was created, and the conceptual device Soviet Rayon (Regional) school of economic geography economic geography was developed.

Kolosovskiy entered such concepts into scientific practice as the power-production cycle (set of the manufactures united by communications on raw materials and energy), a territorial and production complex (set of manufactures from which placing on one platform additional economic benefit is reached).

== Works ==
- Economy of the Far East, М, 1926 (co-author)
- The Future of Uralo-Kuznetsk industrial complex, М – Л, 1932
- Bases of economic division into districts, М, 1958
- The Theory of economic division into districts, М, 1969
- Kolosovskiy, N. N. (1961). The territorial‐production combination (complex) in Soviet economic geography. Journal of Regional Science, 3(1), 1-25. https://doi.org/10.1111/j.1467-9787.1961.tb00889.x

== See also ==
- Nikolay Baranskiy
