= Lgov =

Lgov (Russian: Льгов) is the name of several inhabited localities in Russia.

Urban localities

- Lgov, Kursk Oblast, a town in Kursk Oblast

Rural localities

- Lgov, Khotynetsky District, Oryol Oblast, a selo in Ilyinsky Selsoviet of Khotynetsky District of Oryol Oblast
- Lgov, Novosilsky District, Oryol Oblast, a settlement in Prudovsky Selsoviet of Novosilsky District of Oryol Oblast
