= Siberian Social-Democratic Union =

Political Parties in Russia

Siberian Social-Democratic Union (Russian: Сибирский социал-демократический союз) was a Siberian organization of Social Democratic groups. It was formed in the spring of 1901, by the initiative of the Tomsk Social-Democrats, including Social-Democratic groups from Krasnoyarsk, Irkutsk, and the Taiga. In the end of 1901 the union adopted a programme which defined its mission as fighting for political freedom of the proletariat, and for socialism. The union was initially dominated by 'economists'.

In 1902, a Chita committee was formed, and groups in Achinsk, Barnaul, Kansk, Novonikolayevsk, Petropavlovsk and other locations. In 1903, an Omsk committee was formed. In January 1903 the union was affiliated to the Russian Social Democratic Labour Party, and changed name to Siberian Social-Democratic Union - RSDLP Committee. The union now had begun adhering to the Iskra line. The 1st conference of the union held in the summer 1903 reaffirm the commitment of the organization to the Iskra line. However, the delegates of the union at the 2nd RSDLP congress, Trotsky and V. E. Mandelson, took a Menshevik position. The union later condemned their behaviour at the congress.
