= Aleksey Krylov =

Russian naval engineer, mathematician, and memoirist (1863–1945)

- Russian: Алексей Николаевич Крылов
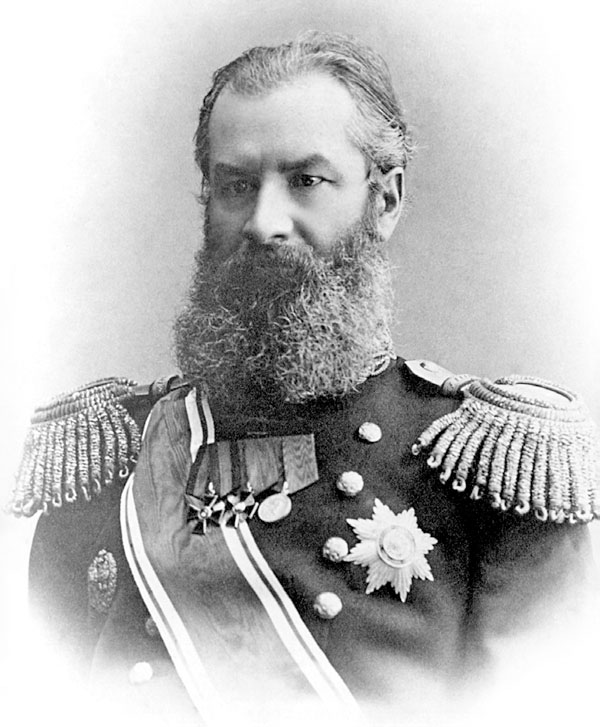
- Official portrait, 1914
- Born: August 3, 1863 O.S. (August 15, 1863 N.S.); Alatyrsky uezd of Simbirsk Gubernia, Russian Empire
- Died: October 26, 1945 (aged 82); Leningrad, USSR
- Burial place: Leningrad, USSR
- Military career
- Allegiance: Russian Empire; USSR
- Branch: Imperial Russian Navy
- Service years: 1878–1917
- Rank: General of the fleet
- Known for: Krylov subspace Froude–Krylov force

Signature
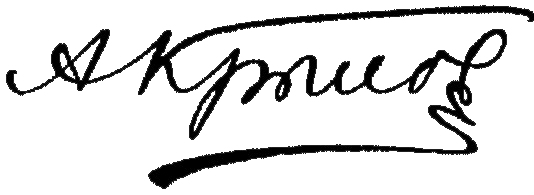

Aleksey Nikolaevich Krylov (Russian: Алексе́й Никола́евич Крыло́в; 15 August [O.S. 3 August] 1863 – October 26, 1945) was a Russian naval engineer, applied mathematician and memoirist. In mathematics, Krylov subspace and Krylov subspace methods are named after him.

== Biography ==
Aleksey Nikolayevich Krylov was born on August 3 O.S., 1863 in Visyaga village near the town of Alatyr, Simbirsk Governorate, Russian Empire (today Krylovo, Chuvashia) to the family of a retired artillery officer. His father, Nikolay Aleksandrovich Krylov (1830-1911), was the local landlord and vice-Marshal of Nobility, but had relatively liberal views and later led the zemskaya uprava (the Executive Board of the Zemstvo self-government system) in Alatyr. His mother, née Sofya Viktorovna Lyapunova, was a member of the distinguished Lyapunov family (the mathematician Aleksandr Mikhailovich Lyapunov and musician Sergei Mikhailovich Lyapunov were his second cousins).

In 1878 Krylov entered the Naval College (rus. Морское училище) and graduated with distinction in 1884. There he did his first scientific work with Ivan de Collong on Deviation of magnetic compasses. The theory of magnetic and gyro-compasses fascinated him for all of his life; later he published important works related to the dynamics of the magnetic compass and proposed the dromoscope, a device that would automatically calculate the deviation of a compass. He also was a pioneer of the gyrocompass, being the first to create a full theory of it.

After spending several years at the Main Hydrographic Administration and at a shipbuilding plant (French-Russian shipbuilding company), in 1888 he continued his study in the Naval Academy of Saint Petersburg. He was a talented and promising student and after graduating ahead-of-schedule from the Academy in 1890, stayed on as mathematics and ship-theory lecturer.

Fame came to him in the 1890s, when his pioneering Theory of oscillating motions of the ship, significantly extending William Froude's rolling theory, became internationally known. This was the first comprehensive theoretical study in the field. In 1898 Krylov received a Gold Medal from the British Royal Institution of Naval Architects, the first time the prize was awarded to a foreigner. He also created a theory of damping of ship rolling and pitching, and was the first to propose gyroscopic damping which now is the most common way of damping the roll.

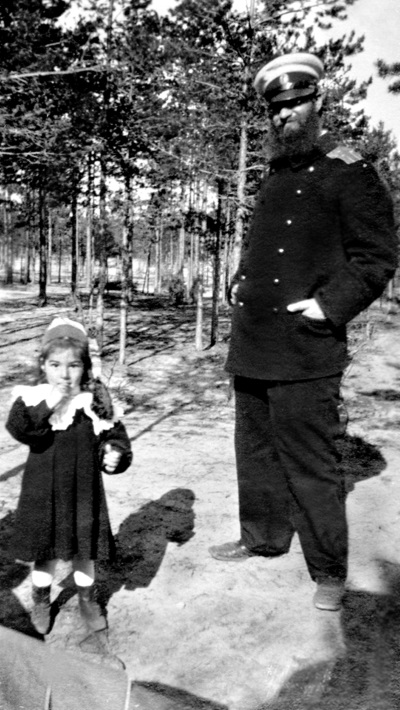
Aleksey Krylov with daughter Anna in 1904

After 1900 Krylov actively collaborated with Stepan Makarov, admiral and maritime scientist, working on the ship floodability problem. The results of this work soon became classic and are used worldwide today. Years later, Krylov wrote about the early ideas of Makarov to fight the heel of a sinking ship by flooding its undamaged compartments: "This appeared to be such a great nonsense [to the naval officials] that it took 35 years… to convince [them] that the ideas of the 22-year-old Makarov are of great practical value".

Krylov was well known for his sharp tongue and quick wits. His put downs to government and Duma officials were legendary. As a capable naval consultant, he claimed that his advice saved the government more than the cost of a dreadnought.

In 1917 he became CEO of the Russian society for shipbuilding and trade (the ROPiT, Русское общество пароходостроительства и торговли). After the October Revolution he peacefully transferred the ROPiT merchant fleet to the Soviet government and continued to work for the Russian Navy. In 1921 he was sent to London to re-establish scientific contacts, working there as a representative of the Soviet government. In 1927 he returned to the Soviet Union.

Krylov wrote about 300 papers and books. They span a wide range of topics, including shipbuilding, magnetism, artillery, mathematics, astronomy, and geodesy. His floodability tables have been used worldwide. Of note are his works in hydrodynamics including theory of ships moving in shallow water (he was the first to explain and calculate the significant increase of hydrodynamic resistance in shallow water) and the theory of solitons. In 1904 he built the first machine in Russia for integrating Ordinary differential equations.

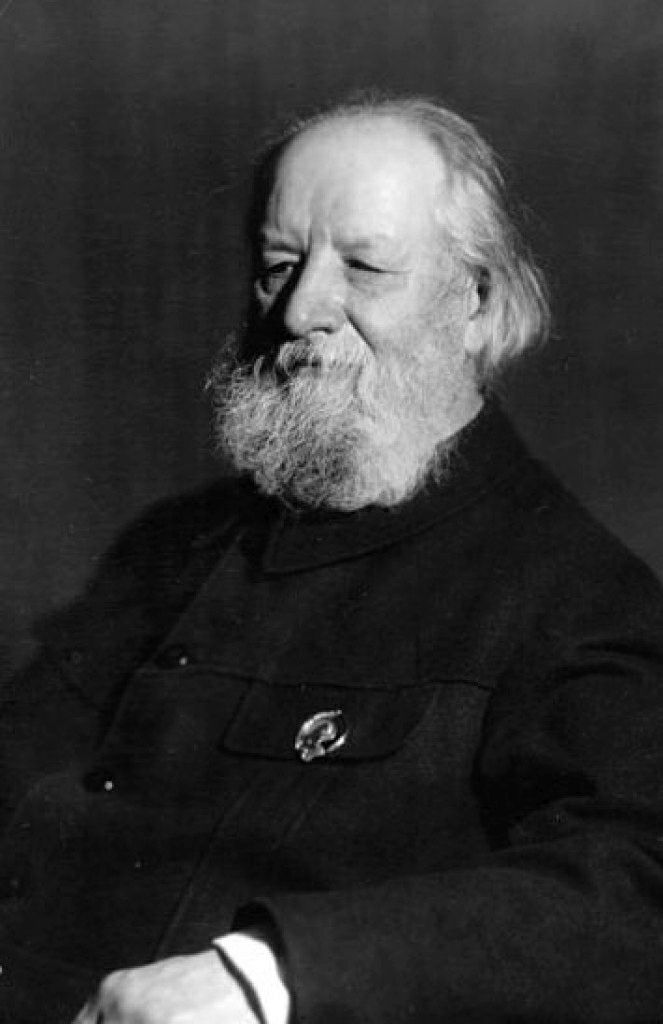
Krylov in the 1930s

In 1931 he published a paper on what is now called the Krylov subspace and Krylov subspace methods. The paper deals with eigenvalue problems, namely, with computation of the characteristic polynomial coefficients of a given matrix. Krylov was concerned with efficient computations and, as a computational scientist, he counts the work as a number of separate numerical multiplications, something not very typical for a 1931 mathematical paper. Krylov begins with a careful comparison of the existing methods that include the worst-case-scenario estimate of the computational work in the Jacobi method. Later, he presents his own method which is superior to the known methods of that time and is still widely used.

Krylov also published the first Russian translation of Isaac Newton's Philosophiæ Naturalis Principia Mathematica (1915).

Aleksey Nikolaevich Krylov died in Leningrad (i.e. Saint Petersburg) on October 26, 1945, shortly after the end of World War II. He is buried in the Volkovo Cemetery, not far from the physiologist Ivan Pavlov and the chemist Dmitri Mendeleev. He was awarded the Stalin Prize (1941), three Orders of Lenin, Hero of Socialist Labor (1943), and was an academician of the Russian Academy of Sciences (after 1916). The crater Krylov on the Moon is named after him, as are the Krylov Peninsula and the Krylov State Research Center (a shipbuilding research institute of which Krylov had been superintendent).

In one of his autobiographical papers, Krylov describes his activity as 'shipbuilding, i.e. application of Mathematics to various Maritime problems.'

== Family ==
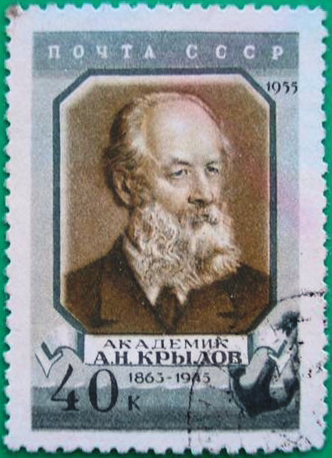
On a 1955 stamp

Krylov married his second cousin Elisaveta Dmitrievna Dranitsyna. His daughter Anna married famous physicist Pyotr Kapitsa, discoverer of superfluidity and Nobel Prize in Physics winner. Their children included geographer Andrey Kapitsa, (1931–2011), who discovered Lake Vostok, the largest subglacial lake in Antarctica 4,000 meters below the continent's ice cap, and Sergey Kapitsa (1928–2012), physicist and demographer, host of the popular and long-running Russian scientific TV show, Evident, but Incredible. Aleksey Krylov was very close to his son-in-law.

Victor Henri, a French-Russian physical chemist and physiologist, was Krylov's paternal half-brother and maternal first cousin.

== See also ==
- Froude–Krylov force
