= Resonance method of ice destruction =

Method of breaking ice sheets through mechanical vibration

External videos
- Resonance method of ice destruction part 1 of 2 (icebreaking by resonance)
- Resonance method of ice destruction part 2 of 2 (icebreaking by resonance)

The Resonance method of ice destruction means breaking sheet-ice which has formed over a body of water by causing the ice and water to oscillate up and down until the ice suffers sufficient mechanical fatigue to cause a fracture.

== Resonance ==
If static force is applied to a sheet of ice it will flex slightly before suffering a catastrophic failure. Since the ice will bend slightly when any capable vehicle travels on ice-covered water, it follows that travelling at some critical speed may impose sufficient flexing of the ice sheet to cause resonance, and this may result in positive feedback effectively amplifying the oscillation within the body of water supporting the ice beneath the vehicle.

== Flexural gravity waves ==
Flexural gravity waves (FGW) are three-dimensional oscillations of forces which occur within a disturbed liquid and are usually observed as surface waves.

There have been cases of destruction of ice by flexural gravity waves produced by moving cars, trains on railway crossings, aircraft during takeoff and landing, etc. However, at present the most appropriate vehicles for implementation of the method are amphibious hovercraft, also known as air cushion vehicles (ACV).

The primary means to break the ice cover is the icebreaker fleet. However, large energy consumption for the destruction of the ice, the inability to perform icebreaking operations in shallow waters because of the deep draught of icebreakers, and other difficulties have prompted a search for fundamentally new ways of destruction of ice. One of them is designed by Viktor Kozin author of the study: "Resonance method of destruction of ice cover".

== Overview of technique ==
The motion of a load over ice cover develops a system of flexural gravity waves. This is a combination of flexural vibrations of the ice plate and associated gravitational waves in the water. When the velocity of the load is close to the minimum phase velocity of the FGW, the water ceases to support the ice sheet, and support is achieved only by the elastic properties of the ice. The amplitude of the FGW increases sharply and, with a sufficient load, destruction begins. The power consumption is several times lower (depending on the thickness of the ice) compared with icebreakers and ice-breaking attachments. This method of ice destruction is known as the resonance method.

== Advantages ==
The advantages of hovercraft are the lack of exposure of the vehicle body to the ice and the ability to cross safely over snow and ice cover, broken ice and open water. The virtual absence of draught in hovercraft can break the ice in pools of any depth.

Using a hovercraft for destruction of ice is desirable because this type of vehicle makes possible a combination of transport and ice-breaking, and its all-terrain qualities facilitate year-round operation.

The high speed of destruction of ice by hovercraft can effectively make an early opening of individual sections of rivers and reservoirs. This may not only increase the period of navigation, but also prevent the phenomenon of mash. Working an ACV in the resonant regime is effective not only on surface ice but also on deep ice, and this can prevent disasters occurring during freeze-up and drifting.

== Research ==
Scientist Viktor Kozin has obtained experimental theoretical curves, which reveal all the possibilities of his method.
