= MSU Faculty of Geography =

Faculty of Moscow State University

Coordinates: 55°42′00″N 37°31′46″E

Faculty of Geography Lomonosov Moscow State University
- Географический факультет МГУ имени М.В. Ломоносова
- President: Nikolai Kasimov
- Dean: Sergei Dobrolyubov
- Location: Moscow, Russia
- Campus: Urban

MSU Faculty of Geography (Russian: Географический факультет МГУ) is a faculty of Moscow State University, created in 1938 by order #109 dated 23 July 1938. There are 15 departments:

== Human geography branch ==
- Department of Social and Economic Geography of foreign countries
- Department of Economic And Social Geography of Russia
- Department of Geography of World Economy
- Department of Recreational Geography and Tourism

== Physical geography branch ==
- Department of Physical Geography and Landscape Science
- Department of Geomorphology and Palaeogeography
- Department of Glaciology and Cryolithology

== Hydrometeorological branch ==
- Department of Hydrology
- Department of Meteorology and Climatology
- Department of Oceanology

== Geoecological branch ==
- Department of Biogeography
- Department of Physical Geography of the World and Geoecology
- Department of Environmental Management
- Department of Geochemistry of Landscapes and Soil Geography

== Geoinformatics branch ==
- Department of Mapping and Geoinformatics

== Research laboratories ==
- Laboratory of Renewable Energy Sources
- Laboratory of Geoecology of the Northern Territories
- Laboratory of Complex Mapping
- Laboratory of Recent Deposits and Pleistocene Palaeogeography
- Laboratory of Regional Analysis and Political Geography
- Laboratory of Snow Avalanches and Debris Flows
- World Data Center for Geography
- The Makkaveev Laboratory of Soil Erosion and Fluvial Processes
