= Gapontsev =

Gapontsev (masculine, Russian: Гапонцев) or Gapontseva (feminine, Russian: Гапонцева) is a Russian surname. Notable people with the surname include:

- Valentin Gapontsev (1939–2021), Russian-American billionaire
- Vladimir Gapontsev (born 1985), Russian classical guitarist
