= Felix Gantmacher =

Soviet mathematician

- Феликс Рувимович Гантмахер
- Born: Felix Ruvimovich Gantmacher; 23 February 1908; Odessa, Russian Empire (now Ukraine)
- Died: 16 May 1964 (aged 56)
- Education: Odessa University
- Scientific career
- Fields: Mathematics
- Workplaces: Moscow Institute of Physics and Technology

Felix Ruvimovich Gantmacher (Russian: Феликс Рувимович Гантмахер) (23 February 1908 – 16 May 1964) was a Soviet mathematician, professor at Moscow Institute of Physics and Technology, well known for his contributions in mechanics, linear algebra and Lie group theory. In 1925–1926 he participated in seminar guided by Nikolai Chebotaryov in Odessa and wrote his first research paper in 1926.

His book Theory of Matrices (1953) is a standard reference of linear algebra. It has been translated into various languages including a two-volume version in English prepared by Joel Lee Brenner, Donald W. Bushaw, and S. Evanusa. George Herbert Weiss noted that "this book cannot be recommended too highly as it contains material otherwise unavailable in book form".

Gantmacher collaborated with Mark Krein on Oscillation Matrices and Kernels and Small Vibrations of Mechanical Systems.

In 1939 he contributed to the classification problem of the real Lie algebras.

In the same year he wrote on automorphisms of complex Lie groups.

His son Vsevolod Gantmacher was a noted physicist.

== Publication ==
- Gantmacher, F. (1970). Lectures in Analytical Mechanics. Moscow, Soviet Union: Mir Publishers.
