= Kudryavtsev =

Kudryavtsev or Kudriavtsev (masculine) or Kudryavtseva (feminine) is a common surname and was a noble family in Russia. It is the last name of the following people:

== Male ==
- Alexander Kudryavtsev, a world champion Greco-Roman wrestler in the 1980s
- Alexander Kudryavtsev (b. 1985), professional tennis player
- Anatoliy Kudryavtsev (b. 1946), Russian type designer, Prof., Doctor of Arts
- Kirill Kudryavtsev (b. 2004), Russian professional ice hockey player
- Konstantin Borisovich Kudryavtsev (b. 1980), Russian FSB agent allegedly involved in the poisoning of Alexei Navalny, missing since 2020
- Lev Kudryavtsev, mathematician
- Nikolai Kudryavtsev, petroleum geologist
- Nikolay Kudryavtsev, rector of the Moscow Institute of Physics and Technology
- Nikolay Kudryavtsev (singer), singer for the band Zemlyane
- Viktor Kudriavtsev, figure skating coach and choreographer
- Viktor Kudryavtsev (guitarist), guitarist for the band Zemlyane
- Mikhail Konstantinovich Kudryavtsev, ethnographer, ethnologist, and indologist from the USSR

== Female ==
- Alla Kudryavtseva, professional tennis player (daughter of Alexander Kudryavtsev)
- Yana Kudryavtseva, rhythmic gymnast
