= Vsevolod Gantmakher =

Vsevolod Feliksovich Gantmakher (October 8, 1935 – March 5, 2015; Russian: Всеволод Феликсович Гантмахер), was a prominent Russian experimental physicist of Jewish origin, was born in Moscow as son of Felix Gantmacher, a prominent mathematician. He was a full Member of the Russian Academy of Sciences and is known for his fundamental contributions to condensed matter physics especially for the Gantmakher effect and Gantmakher–Kaner oscillations.

== Career ==
Gantmakher graduated from the Moscow Institute of Physics and Technology (MFTI) in 1960 and was accepted for graduate study to Kapitza's Institute for Physical Problems in Moscow where he worked under Yuri Sharvin on high frequency electron properties of metals exploring exotic shapes of Fermi surfaces of metals. There Gantmakher earned his Candidate and Doctor of Sciences degrees for the discovery of both the Gantmakher effect and the Gantmakher–Kaner oscillations. After completing his work at the Kapitza' Institute, Gantmakher moved to the newly established Institute of Solid State Physics in Chernogolovka (an Academic campus near Moscow) which became the stage for his long and productive career. There he established a laboratory that explored frontiers of electron transport in solids covering topics as diverse as high-frequency properties of normal metals, transverse focusing, hot carriers, electron relaxation in semiconductors, and superconductivity including the localization of Cooper pairs.

Gantmakher supervised a large group of young experimenters beginning from their last years as students of MFTI until the time they grew up into independent researchers. Inside his Institute of Solid State Physics he played a leading role in promoting the rules of scientific ethics. He also played an active role in establishing the system of scientific grants in post-Soviet Russia. Since 1990 Gantmakher served as the Editor-in-Chief of JETP Letters, the flagship of Russian physics. Among his awards are a Young Researcher Prize of the Government of USSR and the Kapitza Golden Medal, one of the highest awards of the Russian Academy of Sciences.

== Bibliography ==
- V. F. Gantmakher, A Method of Measuring the Momentum of Electrons in Metals, Sov. Phys. - JETP, 15, 982 (1962).
- V. F. Gantmakher and E. A. Kaner, Radio-Frequency Size Effect in a Magnetic Field Perpendicular to the Surface of a Metal, Sov. Phys. - JETP 21, 1053 (1965)
- V. F. Gantmakher and I. B. Levinson, Carrier Scattering in Metals and Semiconductors (Elsevier, Amsterdam) 1987.
- V. F. Gantmakher, Electrons and Disorder in Solids (Oxford University Press) 2005.
- V. F. Gantmakher and V. T. Dolgopolov, Superconductor-insulator quantum phase transition, PHYSICS-USPEKHI 53, 1-49 (2010).

== See also ==
- Fermi surface
