= Vadim Veniaminovich Brazhkin =

Russian physicist, Academician of the Russian Academy of Sciences

- Вади́м Вениами́нович Бра́жкин
- Brazhkin in 2016
- Born: 24 October 1961 (age 65); Zlatoust, Chelyabinsk Oblast, USSR
- Education: Moscow Institute of Physics and Technology
- Known for: Phase changes of compounds under high pressure
- Scientific career
- Fields: High-pressure physics, phase transition physics, physics of disordered media
- Workplaces: Vereshchagin Institute for High Pressure Physics of the Russian Academy of Sciences

Vadim Veniaminovich Brazhkin (born October 24, 1961, in Zlatoust) is a Russian physicist, academician of the Russian Academy of Sciences (since 2016), and Doctor of Physical and Mathematical Sciences. He is director of the Institute of High Pressure Physics of the Russian Academy of Sciences. He specializes in the physics of phase transitions and disordered media, high-pressure physics, and condensed matter physics. He has authored approximately 500 scientific publications and has been cited over 10,000 times. His h-index is 43 (WOS), 53 (Google Scholar), and 44 (Scopus).

== Early life and education ==
Vadim Veniaminovich Brazhkin was born on October 24, 1961, in Zlatoust. In 1978, he entered the Faculty of Physics and Energy Problems at Moscow Institute of Physics and Technology (MIPT). After graduating from the faculty, he entered graduate school at MIPT. In 1987, he defended his PhD dissertation.

== Career ==
He began working at the Institute for High Pressure Physics, Russian Academy of Sciences (HPPI RAS), located in Troitsk, Moscow. In 1996 he defended his doctoral dissertation. Since 1993, he has held the position of deputy director of the Institute of High Pressure Physics of the Russian Academy of Sciences. In 2016, he became HPPI RAS's Director. In 2011, he was elected as a corresponding member of the Russian Academy of Sciences. In 2016, he was elected as an academician of the Russian Academy of Sciences.

Brazhkin discovered and studied a new phenomenon: phase transformations in melts of elementary substances and simple compounds under pressure. He established that the transformations are accompanied by sharp changes in the structure and properties of the liquid; in a number of substances, dielectric metal transitions are realized. Under the leadership of Brazhkin, a series of fundamental works on the study of sharp and blurred structural transformations in glasses and amorphous solids was also carried out. He discovered the first logarithmic kinetics of such transformations for a number of non-glass-forming molecular compounds ($AsS, P_4Se_3, P_4S_3$) by quenching the melt at high pressures.

While studying the phenomenon of solid-phase amorphization of crystals under pressure, Brazhkin was the first to obtain bulk phases of amorphous tetrahedral semiconductors. He experimentally established that solid-phase amorphization is caused by a decrease in the shear moduli of the corresponding crystal lattices.

Brazhkin has completed a large series of studies on the effect of high pressure on the viscosity of liquids. It has been established that the viscosity of many liquid oxides and chalcogenides undergoing phase transformations drops sharply under compression by several orders of magnitude. Brazhkin showed that most molecular compounds based on light elements are thermodynamically metastable phases. At high pressures, these substances undergo irreversible transformations into polymerized states. Research into transformations in liquids and glasses, conducted by Brazhkin since 1986, has effectively led to the creation of a new direction in condensed matter physics. Brazhkin was co-chairman of the first major international meeting (2001) devoted to phase transformations in disordered media.

In recent years, Brazhkin's research has shifted toward studying the structure and dynamics of supercritical fluids. Brazhkin and his colleagues have obtained significant results in theoretical and experimental studies of fluids. They have established that an analog of the liquid-gas line, in terms of the excitation spectrum in fluids, exists at any pressure. These results demonstrate the need for a significant revision of the "classical" view of the nature of the liquid state.

He is a member of the July 1st Club.

== Awards and honours ==
- On February 5, 2024, he was awarded the Medal of the Order "For Merit to the Fatherland", 2nd class, for his great contribution to the development of Russian science, many years of fruitful work, and in connection with the 300th anniversary of the founding of the Russian Academy of Sciences.
- Laureate of the Russian Academy of Sciences Prize named after A. G. Stoletova (2017)
- Laureate of the People's Prize "Bright Past" (2019)

== Selected works ==
=== Articles ===
- V. V. Brazhkin, I. V. Danilov, O. B. Tsioq, “Secrets of Water and Other Anomalous Liquids: ‘Slow’ Sound, Relaxing Compressibility and Heat Capacity (Mini-Review)”, JETP Letters, 117, issue 11, pp. 840–856, 2023. DOI: 10.31857/S1234567823110071
- V. V. Brazhkin, “‘Quantum Values’ of Extrema of ‘Classical’ Macroscopic Quantities,” UFN, 193, No. 11, 1227, 2023. DOI: 10.3367/UFNr.2022.11.039261
- "New Kinds of Phase Transitions: Transformations in Disoredered Substances", Eds: V.V. Brazhkin, S.V. Buldyrev, V.N. Ryzhov, H. E. Stanley, NATO Science Series II: Mathematics, Physics and Chemistry - Vol. 81, Kluver Academic Publishers, Netherlands, 2002.
- V. V. Brazhkin, R. N. Voloshin, S. V. Popova, “Semiconductor-metal transition in liquid Se”, JETP Letters, 50, 392–395, 1989.
- V. V. Brazhkin, A. G. Lyapin, S. V. Popova, R. N. Voloshin, “Non-equilibrium phase transitions and amorphization in Si, Si/GaAs, Ge and Ge/GaAs,” Phys. Rev. B, No. N 12, 7549–7565, 1995.
- E. L. Gromnitskaya, O. V. Stal'gorova, V. V. Brazhkin, and A. G. Lyapin, “Ultrasonic study of the nonequilibrium pressure-temperature diagram of H2O ice,” Phys. Rev. B 64, 94205–94220, 2001.
- V. V. Brazhkin, A. G. Lyapin, R. J. Hemley, “Harder than diamond: dreams and reality,” Phil. Mag A, 82: (2) 231–253, 2002.
- V. V. Brazhkin and A. G. Lyapin, "Metastable High-Pressure Phases of Low-Z Compounds: Creation of a New Chemistry or a Prompt for Old Principles?", Nature Materials, 3, 497–500, 2004.
- V. V. Brazhkin, "Metastable phases, phase transformations and phase diagrams in physics and chemistry”, Uspekhi Fizicheskikh Nauk, 176, No. 7, 745–750, 2006.
- V. V. Brazhkin, “High pressure synthesized materials: treasure and hints,” High Pressure Research, 27, No. 3, 333–351, 2007.
- V. V. Brazhkin, I. Katayama, M. V. Kondrin et al., Asse melt under pressure: one substance, therree likuyds, Fis. Rev. Let 100 145701 (2008)
- V. V. Brazhkin, M. Kanzaki, Ken-ichi Funakoshi, and Y. Katayama, “Viscosity Behavior Spanning Four Orders of Magnitude in As-S Melts under High Pressure,” Phys. Rev. Lett, 102, 115901, 2009.
- V. V. Brazhkin, “Interparticle interaction in condensed matter: elements ‘more equal than others’”, Phys. Usp., 179, No. 4, 393–401, 2009.
- V. V. Brazhkin, I. Farnan, K. Funakoshi, M. Kanzaki, Y. Katayama, A. G. Lyapin and H. Saitoh, “Structural transformations and anomalous viscosity in the B2O3 melt under high pressure,” Phys. Rev. Lett 105, 115701, 2010.
- V. V. Brazhkin et al., “Where is the supercritical fluid region on the phase diagram?” Physics Uspekhi 182(11) 1137–1156 (2012)
- V. V. Brazhkin and Kostya Trachenko, "What separates a liquid from a gas?"
- M. V. Kondrin, N. A. Nikolaev, K. N. Boldyrev, Y. M. Shulga, I. P. Zibrov and V. V. Brazhkin, “Bulk graphanes synthesized from benzene and pyridine” CrystEngComm, 19, 958(2017)
- V. V. Brazhkin, “Can glass-forming liquids be 'simple'?”, Physics Uspekhi, 189, No. 6, 666–672, 2019.
- K. Trachenko, V. V. Brazhkin, «Minimal quantum viscosity from fundamental physics constant», Science Advances, 6, eaba3747, 2020.
- K. Trachenko, V. V. Brazhkin, “Minimal quantum viscosity from fundamental physics constant,” Science Advances, 6, eaba3747, 2020.
- V. V. Brazhkin, “Ultrahard nanomaterials: myths and reality”, Physics Uspekhi, 190, No. 6, 561–584, 2020.
- V. V. Brazhkin, “Why does statistical mechanics ‘work’ in condensed matter?” Uspekhi Fizicheskikh Nauk, 191 No. 10 (2021) 1107
