= Georgiy L. Stenchikov =

Applied mathematician and climate scientist

- Occupations: Applied mathematician, climate scientist, atmospheric physicist, researcher, author, and academic
- Awards: Prize for the development of multi-tasking software, Council of Ministers of the Soviet Union (1986); Co-authored the Nobel Prize-winning IPCC AR4 report (2007); Future of Life Award for pioneering research of climatic consequences of Nuclear War (2022)

Academic background
- Education: M.S., Physics and Mathematics, Asymptotic study of the effect of thermal radiation on gas flow in a strong explosion in the atmosphere Ph.D., Numerical and Analytical Study of Weak Plasma Turbulence HABILITATION, Modeling of the Large-Scale Anthropogenic Impacts on Climate
- Alma mater: Moscow Physical-Technical Institute
- Thesis: (1977)

Georgiy L. Stenchikov is an applied mathematician and climate scientist focusing on studies of physical processes that govern the Earth's climate. He is a professor in the Department of Earth Science and Engineering at the King Abdullah University of Science and Technology in Saudi Arabia.

Stenchikov's research is focused on atmospheric physics, climate modeling, aerosols, radiative transfer, fluid dynamics, climate impacts of volcanic eruptions, and mineral dust. He has authored two books, Mathematical Modeling of Climate (in Russian) and Gotterdämmerung Globale Folgen eines atomaren Konflikts (in German). He has authored over 300 articles in journals, including Science, Journal of Geophysical Research: Atmospheres, and Atmospheric Chemistry and Physics. He contributed to the Nobel Prize-winning report from the Intergovernmental Panel on Climate Change (IPCC-AR4) of 2007 and has been awarded a Prize from the Council of Ministers of the Soviet Union for his work on climate impact modeling. In 2022 he received a Future of Life Award for nuclear winter research.

== Education and early career ==
Stenchikov obtained his master's degree in Physics and Mathematics from the Moscow Physical-Technical Institute in 1973, and earned a Ph.D. in Numerical and Analytical Study of Weak Plasma Turbulence from the same university in 1977. He then completed his habilitation in Modeling the Large-Scale Anthropogenic Impacts on Climate in 1989 from the Computer Center of the USSR Academy of Sciences in Moscow, Russia. From 1976 to 1992, he worked at the Computer Center of the USSR Academy of Sciences as a junior scientist, senior scientist, and head of the Branch of Mathematical Modeling of Anthropogenic Impacts. During this tenure, his team conducted computational analyses that explored the impact of human activities on Earth's climate. In the 1980s, with Vladimir Alexandrov, he led the studies of the climatic consequences of a nuclear war, conducting the first 3-D simulation of climate response to massive emissions of soot in the forest and urban fires fought by nuclear explosions, the effect called nuclear winter.

== Career ==
Since 1992, Stenchikov has worked with Alan Robock on the effects of explosive volcanism on Earth's climate in the Department of Meteorology at the University of Maryland, College Park, USA. In 1998, he became a research professor in the Department of Environmental Sciences of Rutgers University, and worked there for a decade. From 2009 to 2021, he was a founding professor and a chair of the Earth Sciences and Engineering Program at King Abdullah University of Science and Technology (KAUST) in Saudi Arabia.

== Research ==
Stenchikov has made contributions to climate modeling. His work, which involves the development of numerical models to simulate the intricate interactions among aerosols, clouds, and radiation, has enhanced the understanding of the role of stratospheric and tropospheric aerosols in shaping regional and global climate, including their influence on temperature, atmospheric and ocean circulation, and extreme weather events. He received the Highlight Award from the American Geophysical Union for his research publication titled "The Impact of Aerosols on simulated ocean temperature and heat content in the 20th Century".

=== Volcanic impact on climate ===
Following his early studies of the climate impact of smoke from urban fires ignited by nuclear explosions, Stenchikov's research has focused on understanding the impacts of volcanic explosions on climate. A volcanic cloud in the aftermath of a strong explosive volcanic eruption could cover the entire Earth for several years, reflecting solar radiation and causing a long-lasting cooling effect. Since 1850, volcanic eruptions have offset about 30% of ocean heat uptake forced by greenhouse gas warming. He found that along with global cooling, volcanic impacts can cause large-scale changes in atmospheric and ocean circulation, forcing the positive phase of the Arctic Oscillation, accelerating Atlantic Meridional Overturning Circulation, increasing the polar sea-ice extent and prolonging El Ninos. Despite the global nature of volcanic forcing, the climate responses have pronounced regional signatures, such as winter warming in Siberia and freezing winters in the Middle East. He conducted new simulations of the Toba super-eruption, a particularly devastating event that occurred in Sumatra around 75,000 years ago and emitted in the atmosphere about 2 billion tons of sulfur dioxide. He modified a regional atmospheric chemistry model, WRF-Chem, to capture the initial stage of the volcanic cloud formed after the 1991 Pinatubo eruption. The simulations showed that in the first week after the eruption, the volcanic cloud rose into the stratosphere at a rate of 1 km/day, driven initially by ash's solar absorption and later by sulfate aerosol absorption of solar and terrestrial radiation. This profoundly affected the long-term evolution and radiative impact of the volcanic cloud.

=== Regional climate modeling ===
To study climate change and variability, Stenchikov has calculated the future climate projections employing the global high-resolution atmospheric model (HiRAM) with a spatial resolution of 25x25 km2 and performed climate downscaling using nested regional model WRF-Chem with fine grid spacing down to 3 km. To add to physical consistency in modeling the Middle East climate, he coupled the regional atmospheric model (WRF-Chem) with the regional ocean modeling system (ROMS), accounting for aerosol and atmospheric chemistry processes, and conducted the first coupled regional simulations of the impact of tropospheric dust and stratospheric volcanic aerosols on the Middle East and the Red Sea. His research highlighted that a combination of coupled atmospheric and oceanic simulations and ground-based aerosol measurements are the best tools for informing governments when they have to make critical decisions regarding air quality and climate change. His recent research suggested that forestation of the Red Sea Arabian coastal plain was unlikely to increase precipitation in the breezes zone. However, decreasing land-surface albedo by deploying solar panels could potentially generate 1.5 Gt of rainwater annually to meet the needs of 5 million people.

=== Effects of dust on the Middle East climate. ===
In desert regions like the Middle East, dust profoundly impacts the environment, climate, air quality, and human health. In addition, dust affects the efficiency of solar energy devices by reducing the downward solar flux and settling on their optically active surfaces. Stenchikov demonstrated that the desert climate is extremely sensitive to radiative forcing, the change in Earth's energy balance associated with greenhouse gas emissions, desertification, urbanization, and shrinking vegetation cover. This effect is influenced by an abundance of particulates, including sand, dust, and anthropogenic pollutants, suspended in the air, collectively named aerosols. The Middle East and North Africa (MENA) contribute to over half of global dust emissions, and dust significantly influences the regional radiative balance and atmospheric circulation. The prolonged drought and social conflicts led to the growth of dust aerosol optical depth, which characterizes the radiative effect of aerosols. Over the past three decades, observations and computer simulations have shown that the Arabian Peninsula's average temperature has been increasing by about 0.5 °C per decade, exceeding almost twice the trend observed in the northern hemisphere. The analysis shows that atmospheric heating in the middle troposphere caused by Saharan dust alters Hadley and Walker circulation, moving the rain belt north in the summer and increasing precipitation in the Sahel. He highlighted that the radiative surface cooling of the Southern Red Sea due to accumulated dust layers reaches 40 W/m2, affecting the circulation and energy balance of the sea - an effect that had not been previously recognized. In recent research, he stated that the natural and anthropogenic aerosol mix could severely affect air quality. The interaction between dust and anthropogenic aerosols alters the aerosol's optical properties, radiative forcing, and their interaction with clouds. The direct radiative forcing from aerosols diminishes the pace of regional warming, but its future projections are largely unknown.

== Awards and honors ==
- 1985 – Gold Medal Award, National Exhibition of the Economy Achievements of the USSR
- 1986 – Prize for the development of multi-tasking software, Council of Ministers of the USSR
- 2003 – Group Achievement Award, The National Aeronautics and Space Administration
- 2004 – Outstanding Scientific Paper Award, The National Oceanic and Atmospheric Administration
- 2007 – Co-authored the Nobel Prize-winning IPCC AR4 report, The Noble Foundation
- 2022 – Award for Nuclear Winter Studies, Future of Life Award Institute, USA
- 2024 – ACM Gordon Bell Prize for Climate Modelling, USA

== Bibliography ==
=== Books ===
- Mathematical Modeling of Climate (1986)
- Gotterdämmerung Globale Folgen eines atomaren Konflikts (1990)

=== Selected articles ===
- Александров, В.В.; Стенчиков, Г.Л. (1975). "О влиянии излучения на течение газа при сильном взрыве для большого значения времени" [Effect of Radiation on Gas Flow in Powerful Explosions for Considerable Time Value]. Прикладная математика и механика (in Russian). 32 (2): 246–252.
- Александров, В.В.; Стенчиков, Г.Л. (1984). "Об одном вычислительном эксперименте, моделирующем климатические последствия ядерной войны" [Numerical simulation of the climatic consequences of a nuclear war]. Журнал Вычислительной Математики и Математической Физики (in Russian). 24 (1): 140–144.
- Stenchikov, G. L. (1986). Numerical Modeling of the Nuclear Winter Taking into Account Aerosol Spreading (in Russian). Doklady Akademii Nauk SSSR (translated - Transactions of the USSR Academy of Sciences, Earth Science Sections), 287(3), 598–602.
- Stenchikov, Georgiy L.; Kirchner, Ingo; Robock, Alan; Graf, Hans-F.; Antuña, Juan Carlos; Grainger, R. G.; Lambert, Alyn; Thomason, Larry (27 June 1998). "Radiative forcing from the 1991 Mount Pinatubo volcanic eruption". Journal of Geophysical Research: Atmospheres. 103 (D12): 13837–13857. Bibcode:1998JGR...10313837S. doi:10.1029/98JD00693. hdl:21.11116/0000-0004-ECBD-E.
- Yip, C. M. A., Gunturu, U. B., & Stenchikov, G. L. (2017). High-altitude wind resources in the Middle East. Scientific reports, 7(1), 9885.
- Osipov, S., & Stenchikov, G. (2018). Simulating the regional impact of dust on the Middle East climate and the Red Sea. Journal of Geophysical Research: Oceans, 123(2), 1032–1047.
- Parajuli, S. P., Stenchikov, G. L., Ukhov, A., & Kim, H. (2019). Dust emission modeling using a new high‐resolution dust source function in WRF‐Chem with implications for air quality. Journal of Geophysical Research: Atmospheres, 124(17-18), 10109–10133.
- Ukhov, A., Mostamandi, S., Krotkov, N., Flemming, J., Da Silva, A., Li, C., ... & Stenchikov, G. (2020). Study of SO Pollution in the Middle East Using MERRA‐2, CAMS Data Assimilation Products, and High‐Resolution WRF‐Chem Simulations. Journal of Geophysical Research: Atmospheres, 125(6), e2019JD031993.
- Ukhov, A., Mostamandi, S., Da Silva, A., Flemming, J., Alshehri, Y., Shevchenko, I., & Stenchikov, G. (2020). Assessment of natural and anthropogenic aerosol air pollution in the Middle East using MERRA-2, CAMS data assimilation products, and high-resolution WRF-Chem model simulations. Atmospheric Chemistry and Physics, 20(15), 9281–9310.
- Stenchikov, G. (2021). The role of volcanic activity in climate and global changes. In Climate change (pp. 607–643). Elsevier.
- Stenchikov, G., Ukhov, A., Osipov, S., Ahmadov, R., Grell, G., Cady‐Pereira, K., ... & Iacono, M. (2021). How Does a Pinatubo‐Size Volcanic Cloud Reach the Middle Stratosphere? Journal of Geophysical Research: Atmospheres, 126(10), e2020JD033829.
