= Alexei Fridman =

Soviet and Russian physicist (1940–2008)

Alexey Fridman
- Алексей Фридман
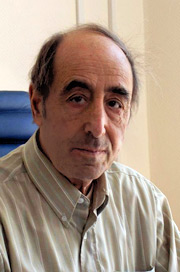
- Fridman in 2008
- Born: 17 February 1940; Moscow, Russian SFSR, Soviet Union
- Died: 29 October 2010 (aged 70); Jerusalem, Israel
- Citizenship: Soviet Union; Russia; Israel
- Education: Novosibirsk State University (Sc.D.)
- Known for: Astrophysics, physics of gravitating systems, plasma physics
- Awards: USSR State Prize (1989); State Prize of the Russian Federation (2003; 2008)
- Scientific career
- Fields: Astrophysics, physics
- Workplaces: Moscow Institute of Physics and Technology, MSU, Institute of Astronomy RAS
- Doctoral advisor: Roald Sagdeev
- Website: http://fpfe.mipt.ru/bazekafedras/ptf/ptf.html

Alexey Maksimovich Fridman (Russian: Алексей Максимович Фридман; 17 February 1940 – 29 October 2010) was a Soviet and Russian physicist specializing in astrophysics, physics of gravitating systems and plasma physics. He discovered new types of instabilities in gravitating media, created the theory of planetary rings and predicted the existence of small Uranus satellites that were later discovered. He also developed the hydrodynamic theory of spiral structure in galaxies. Fridman worked at the Institute of Astronomy of the Russian Academy of Sciences, INASAN, and was professor at the Moscow Institute of Physics and Technology and at Moscow State University.

== Biography ==
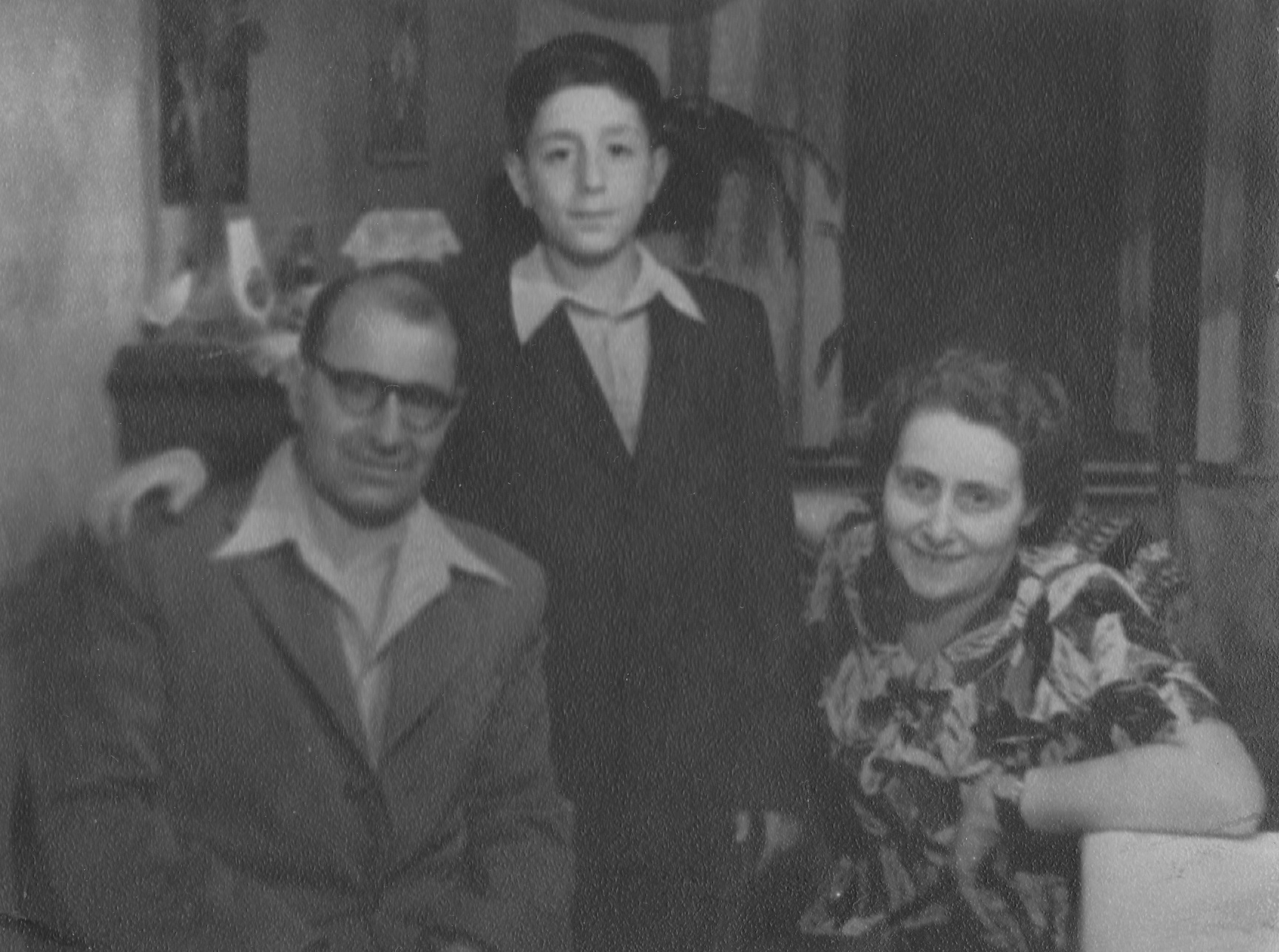
Maksim and Alexey Fridman and Felitsia Sheinbaum, early 1950s

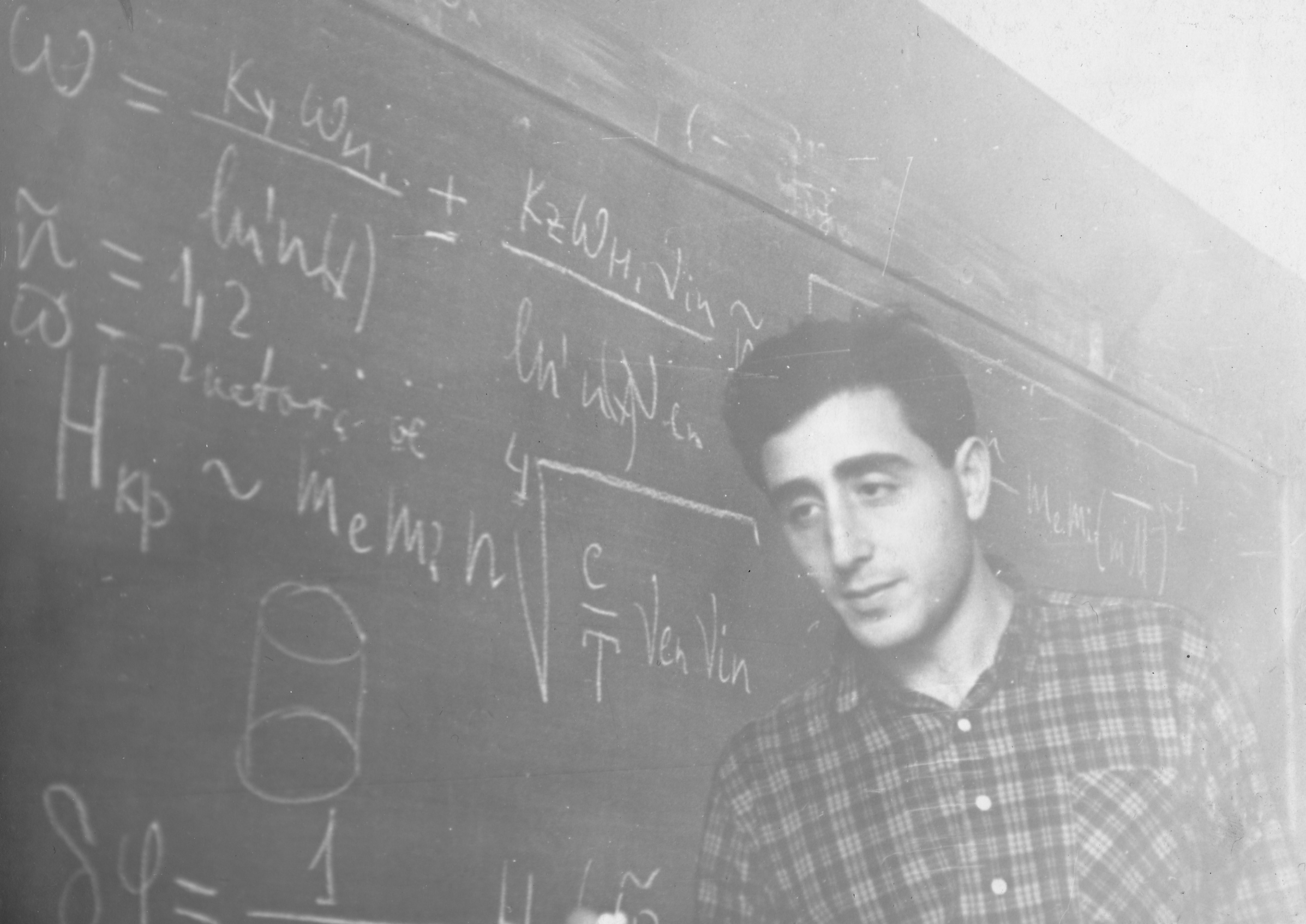
Fridman in the 1970s

Alexey "Alik" Fridman was born in Moscow on February 17, 1940, in a Jewish family, to Maksim Efimovich Fridman (surgeon, MD/Ph.D./Sci.D.; 1903–1990) and Felitsia Yakovlevna Sheinbaum (economist, 1907–1999). The Polyachenko family lived in the same building, and Alik Fridman and Valerij Polyachenko's lifelong friendship (and later scientific collaboration) started before they were five years old.

Following a brief arrest and release of Maksim Fridman perhaps on a prelude to "Doctors' plot" in 1951, the family moved to Frunze (now Bishkek), Kyrgyzstan. Fridman spent summers in Moscow staying with the family of his father's sister, Elena Fridman, and her husband, David A. Frank-Kamenetskii. Following the death of Joseph Stalin and the general amnesty, cities with warm climate filled with criminals and the crime rates skyrocketed. Police was failing, and while in high school Fridman and many other young men joined "the neighborhood watch" brigades organized by Komsomol and police. He did not miss a single training session in military sambo, and acquired many knife scars from the street action. He was the only one who remained alive from his team of four by the graduation.

After high school graduation (1957), Fridman attempted to enter Moscow Physics and Technology Institute, but was failed on the oral math exam as often happened to Jewish applicants. He spent this year at Kyrgyzstan University in Frunze, then entered the Kazan University (1958) where he did undergraduate research with Prof. A. Petrov. In 1958, at the age of 18, Fridman passed the first exam, mathematics, in the series of Theoretical minimum, with Lev Landau.

In 1960, on advice from David A. Frank-Kamenetskii, Fridman transferred to Novosibirsk University, from which he graduated in 1963 with a M. S. in Physics. The academic career of the young scientist went well until in 1968 he signed the "letter of 46" in defense of imprisoned dissidents. However, with support of many prominent scientists, most of the scientists "signers" careers (not fully) recovered, and even though, following defense, Fridman's Doctor of Science dissertation spent over two years "waiting" to be considered for the approval of the Highest Attestation committee, the degree was finally awarded to him in 1972. In 1971 he was offered the opportunity to create a laboratory of plasma physics in SibIZMIR (now Institute of Solar-Terrestrial Physics) Irkutsk, and he moved there with Valerij Polyachenko, Ilia Shukhman, and Alexander Morozov.

Education

- 1963 – M.S., Novosibirsk State University
- 1966 – Ph.D., Novosibirsk State University, "Selected questions in theory of stability of nonuniform plasma in magnetic field".
- 1972 – Doctor of Sc., "Theory of gravitating ionised phase".

Positions

- 1966–1969 – junior scientist, Institute of Nuclear Physics, Novosibirsk
- 1969–1971 – senior scientist, Institute of Nuclear Physics, Novosibirsk; assistant professor, Novosibirsk State University
- 1971–1979 Head of laboratory, IZMIRAN, Irkutsk; department head, Irkutsk State University
- 1979–1985 Senior scientist, Astronomical Council of the Academy of Sciences USSR; professor, Moscow Institute of Physics and Technology
- 1986–2010 Professor, Head of the Department of Physics of Stellar and Planetary Systems, Institute of Astronomy of the Russian Academy of Sciences; professor, Moscow State University
- 2005–2010 Head of the Institute of Physics of Stochastic Structures, Kurchatov Research Center (Moscow)
- 2007–2010 Visiting Professor, Tel Aviv University

=== Memberships ===
- 1994 Elected corresponding member of the Russian Academy of Sciences, RAS
- 2000 Full member of RAS
- 1991–2010 Member of the Organizing committee of IAU

=== Doctoral students ===
- Among Fridman's doctoral students, 10 received a Doctor of Science degree, and 26 a Ph. D. degree.
- Alexander Morozov, D. of Sci., Valery Polyachenko, D. of Sci., Ilia Shukhman, D. of Sci., Nikolai Gor'kavyi, D. of Sci.

=== Discoveries ===
- 1975—1995 discovered new types of instabilities in gravitating media.
- 1971—1985 created the theory of planet rings and predicted Uranus satellites that were later discovered.
- 1972—1996 created hydrodynamic theory of the spiral structure in galaxies.

=== Overview of the scientific contribution ===
- In plasma physics, Fridman predicted the existence of the Alfven's solutions, and worked out the stability theory of thermonuclear plasma at finite high pressure.
- In hydrodynamics, developed the theory of the three strongest instabilities of hydrodynamics: tangential discontinuity, centrifugal, and over-reflection instability.
- In space physics: with his students, developed the linear theory of stability of classical figures of equilibrium in collisionless stellar systems, and laid the foundations of the nonlinear theory of stability and turbulence of gravitating media. As a result, the ranges of the parameters were derived for stability of stellar systems of different geometries.
- Fridman discovered new types of non-Jeans instabilities in gravitating media, some of which develop at timescales less than Jeans' timescale, while others exist in systems that are stable according to Jeans.
- With V. Polyachenko, Fridman derived a new type of asinphase eigen oscillations that exist in multi-component gravitating media as non-collapsing waves with the wavelength above the critical (that would be impossible in a single-component media).
- In Fridman's works, it was first shown that solitons can exist in gravitating media, and transform into gravitating shock waves if dissipation is present. A. Fridman broke the traditional view that shock waves cannot exist in collisionless stellar systems, and proved the existence of "collisionless" shock waves in rotating stellar discs where the free path is the size of the epicycle.
- Fridman first showed that Landau nonlinear damping can exist in stellar systems.
- In the field of physics of planetary rings, Fridman with N. Gorkavyi developed the theory of transfer, collective and resonance processes in a system of non-elastic collisional gravitating particles, that explained the hierarchical structure of the Saturn rings, the resonance nature of the Uran rings, and allowed to predict the small satellites of Uran. The last theoretical prediction was then confirmed when 9 of the 10 satellites discovered by Voyager 2 were found in the predicted regions, with four on the pre-calculated orbits at less than 0.5% error.
- In collaboration with colleagues, Fridman developed the hydrodynamic theory of galactic spiral structure generation. The theory was proved in an original experiment on rotating shallow water that was engineered at Kurchatov Research Center. Using results of this experiment, also giant anticyclones in discs of spiral galaxies were predicted. The anticyclones were later observed, derived from maps of galactic velocities (data from the 6 meter telescope RAS.
- With O. Khoruzhii, Fridman developed nonlinear dynamics of astrophysics discs, deriving formation of mono and dipole vortices in discs, and the new type of accretion - acoustic drift - features that were later detected in planetary rings, and in the gas disc of our Galaxy.
- Fridman developed the theory of weak turbulence for rotating gravitating systems that explains the correlation between main parameters of gas clouds and their structure in our Galaxy, and the observed mass spectrum of the clouds.
- Seismodynamics and Ocean physics: with colleagues, Fridman discovered two components of the Earth's seismic activity: global and mirror. Calculated components of deformation tensor on the Earth surface (polygon in Kyrgyzstan, using 510 GPS stations over 1100 x 500 km^2) and showed correlation between the maxima of these components and the seismic activity regions.
- With collaborators in Tel Aviv University, Fridman developed a program in modeling and destruction of tsunami.

=== Letter of the 46 ===
Fridman was one of the 46 people who signed "the letter of the 46" in 1968 protesting against the closed court proceedings of four Moscow dissidents: A. Ginzburg, Yu. Galanskov, A. Dobrovolskii, and V. Lashkova, addressed to the Supreme Court of Russian Federal Republic and to the Attorney General of the USSR. The text of the letter was published in the New York Times on March 23, 1968. A massive internal political campaign of repressions followed; Fridman was fired from Novosibirsk University, but continued to hold a position at the Institute of Nuclear Physics.

=== Publications ===
Books

- Observational Manifestation of Chaos in Astrophysical Objects, editors: Fridman, Marov, Miller
- Physics of Planetary Rings: Celestial Mechanics of Continuous Media (Astronomy and Astrophysics Library) by Alexei M. Fridman, Nikolai N. Gorkavyi
- Astrophysical Disks: Collective and Stochastic Phenomena (Astrophysics and Space Science Library) by Aleksey M. Fridman, M.Y. Marov, and Ilya G. Kovalenko
- Physics of Gravitating Systems, by A. Fridman, V. Polyachenko, 1984.

Articles

More than 250 scientific papers in plasma physics, quantum physics of solid body, theoretical physics, cosmology, relativistic astrophysics, general problem of gravity physics, dynamics of stellar systems, gravity hydrodynamics, nonlinear dynamics (solitons, shock waves, vortices, turbulence), dynamics of gaseous galactic disk, problem of spiral structure generation, laboratory simulation of spiral-vortex structure generation on the set-up with rotating shallow water, models of the Milky Way, dynamics of accretion disks, dynamics of circumstellar disks, cosmogony, physics of planetary rings, dynamics of space tether systems, seismic activity of the Earth, tsunami wave suppression.

Recent publications

- "Tsunami wave suppression using submarine barriers", A. M. Fridman, L. S. Alperovich, L. Shemer, L. Pustil'nik, D. Shtivelman, An. G. Marchuk, D. Liberzon (2010) UFN, Volume 180, Number 8, Pages 843–850.
- "On some correlations in seismodynamics and on two components of Earth's seismic activity" A. M. Fridman, E. V. Polyachenko, N. R. Nasyrkanov (2010) UFN, Volume 180, Number 3, Pages 303–312.
- "Wave angular momentum and the evolution of planetary rings" I. L. Dranikov, A. M. Fridman (2010) Mon. Not. R. Astron. Soc., Volume 404, Issue 1, pages 415–432.
- "Using an assumption about the monotony of spiral arms to determine the orientation angles of galaxies" A. M. Fridman, S. G. Poltorak (2010) Mon. Not. R. Astron. Soc., Volume 403, Issue 3, pages 1625–1632.
- "Lev Andreevich Artsimovich and extremely strong hydrodynamic instabilities" A. M. Fridman (2009) UFN, 179:12, 1353–1354.
- "The nature of accretion disks of close binary stars: overreflection instability and developed turbulence" A. M. Fridman, D. V. Bisikalo (2008) UFN, 178:6, 577–604.
- "Prediction and discovery of extremely strong hydrodynamic instabilities due to a velocity jump: theory and experiments" A. M. Fridman (2008) UFN, 178:3, 225–242.
- "Prediction and discovery of new structures in spiral galaxies" A. M. Fridman (2007) UFN, 177:2, 121–148.
