= Kirill Zamarayev =

Kirill Ilyich Zamarayev (Russian: Кирилл Ильич Замараев; May 20, 1939 – June 26, 1996) was a Soviet and Russian physical chemist, specialist in the field of catalysis, radiospectroscopy and chemical kinetics in condensed matter.

== Biography ==
He was born on May 20, 1939, in Moscow.

In 1963, Zamarayev graduated from the Moscow Institute of Physics and Technology, after which he worked in this educational institution.

From 1966 to 1977, he worked at the Institute of Chemical Physics.

From 1977, Zamarayev served as deputy director of the Institute of Catalysis in Novosibirsk. He later became the director (1984–1995) of this organization, and at the same time, the head of the department of Novosibirsk State University.

Zamarayev was a delegate to the 18th All-Union Lenininst Young Communist League.

He was also a member of the Central Council of Young Scientists of the Central Committee of the All-Union Lenininst Young Communist League, president of the department of physical chemistry, president of the International Union of Pure and Applied Chemistry, foreign member of the Indian National Academy of Sciences, chairman of the scientific council of the State Committee for Science and Technology on problems "Catalysis and its industrial uses", chairman of the Joint Scientific Council of Chemical Sciences (from 1992), Deputy Chairman of the Scientific Council of the Academy of Sciences for Catalysis and member of the SB RAS Presidium (1988–1996).

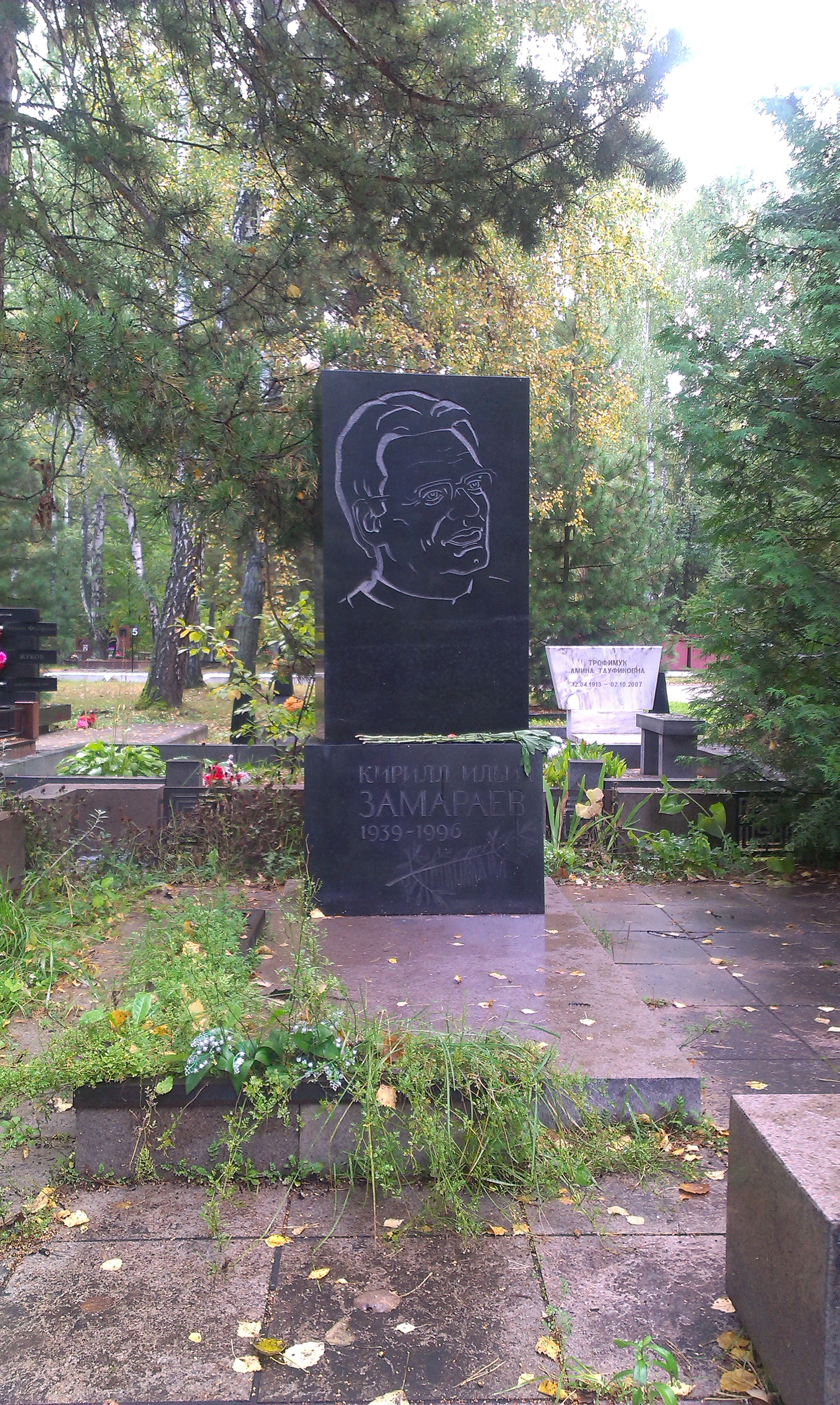
The grave of Kirill Zamarayev at the Yuzhnoye Cemetery, Novosibirsk.

Zamarayev died on June 26, 1996, and was buried at the Yuzhnoye Cemetery (Novosibirsk).

== Scientific activity ==
He was engaged in research in the field of conversation of solar power into chemical energy.

He discovered and investigated tunnel reactions of electron transfer over long distances.

== Awards ==
- Karpinsky FFS Foundation Prize (1995)

=== Orders ===
- Order of the Badge of Honour (1982)
- Order of the Red Banner of Labour (1986)
- Order of Friendship (1996)

== Memory ==
A charitable scientific foundation and an auditorium of Novosibirsk State University are named after him.

A memorial plaque can be viewed on the building of the Institute of Catalysis.
