= Alexander Andreev =

Russian theoretical physicist (1939–2023)

- Александр Андреев
- Born: 10 December 1939; Leningrad, Russian SSR, USSR
- Died: 14 March 2023 (aged 83)
- Education: Moscow Institute of Physics and Technology
- Known for: Andreev reflection
- Awards: Demidov Prize
- Scientific career
- Fields: Superconductivity, quantum liquids and solids, surface phenomena and magnetism
- Institutions: Institute for Physical Problems, Moscow Institute of Physics and Technology

Alexander Fyodorovich Andreev (Russian: Александр Фёдорович Андреев, 10 December 1939 – 14 March 2023) was a Russian theoretical physicist best known for explaining the eponymous Andreev reflection. Andreev was educated at the Moscow Institute of Physics and Technology, starting in 1959 and graduating ahead of schedule in 1961, having been mentored by Landau.

From 1979, Andreev was a professor at the Moscow Institute of Physics and Technology. He focused on the physics of superconductivity, quantum liquids and solids, surface phenomena, and magnetism.

Andreev was a vice-president of the Russian Academy of Sciences (1991–2013).

== Prizes ==
- 1981 - Corresponding Member of USSR Academy of Sciences
- 1984 - Lomonosov Prize of Moscow State University
- 1986 - Lenin Prize (USSR)
- 1987 - Full member of USSR Academy of Sciences
- 1987 - Carus-Medal of German National Academy of Sciences Leopoldina and Carus-Prize of Stadt Schweinfurt
- 1992 - Lorentz Professorship, Leiden University (the Netherlands)
- 1995 - Simon Memorial Prize, Institute of Physics (U.K.)
- 1996 - Honorary member of Ioffe Institute, Russian Academy of Sciences
- 1999 - Kapitza Gold Medal, Russian Academy of Sciences
- 2001-2002 - Jubilee Professor, Chalmers University of Technology (Sweden)
- 2002 - Foreign member of Finnish Academy of Science and Letters
- 2002 - Foreign member of Georgian Academy of Sciences
- 2003 - Independent Prize "Triumph" (Russia)
- 2004 - Pomeranchuk Prize
- 2004 - Doctorate honoris causa of Leiden University (the Netherlands)
- 2004 - Doctorate honoris causa of Kazan State University (Russia)
- 2005 - Honorary professor of Kyrgyz National University
- 2005 - Foreign member of Polish Academy of Sciences
- 2006 - John Bardeen Prize
- 2008 - Foreign member of National Academy of Sciences of Ukraine
- 2011 - Demidov Prize of the Russian Academy of Sciences
- 2012 - Olli V. Lounasmaa Prize from Aalto University
- 2013 - Honorary Doctorate from Lancaster University.
