= Andrey Varlamov =

Italian physicist of Ukrainian origin (born 1954)

Doctor of Philosophy Andrey Varlamov
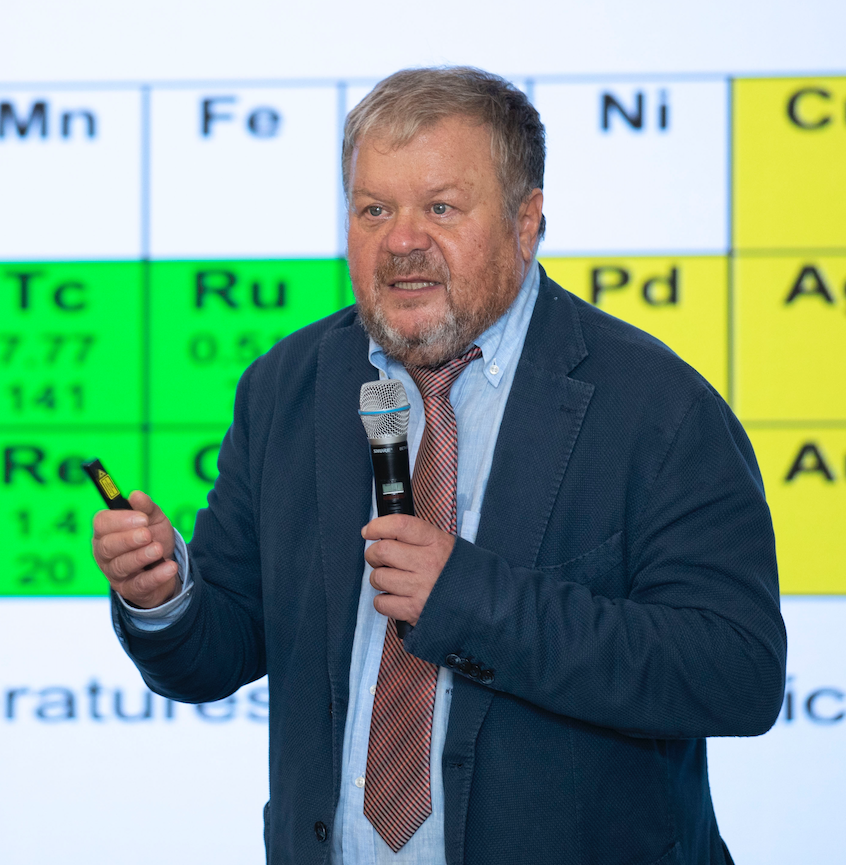
- Born: 25 April 1954; Kiev, Ukrainian SSR
- Education: Kyiv Natural Science Lyceum No. 145; Landau Institute for Theoretical Physics; Moscow Institute of Physics and Technology
- Awards: First Prize in the Vth International Physics Olympiad (1971); Lenin Komsomol Prize (1986); Prix Roberval (2015); Bogolyubov Prize, Ukraine (2018)
- Scientific career
- Workplaces: SPIN-CNR; University of Rome Tor Vergata

Andrey A. Varlamov (born 25 April 1954) is an Italian condensed matter physicist of Ukrainian origin, who works on superconductivity, fluctuation phenomena, graphene physics, and thermoelectricity. He is a principal investigator at the Institute of Superconductors, Oxides and Other Innovative Materials and Devices (SPIN-CNR) in Rome, Italy.

== Early life and education ==
Andrey Varlamov was born on 25 April 1954 in Kyiv, Ukraine. In 1971 he graduated from Kyiv Natural Science Lyceum No. 145. The same year, he was admitted to the Moscow Institute of Physics and Technology and got his master's degree cum laude from the Landau Institute six years later. Immediately after, he started the Ph.D. program under the supervision of A.A. Abrikosov at the Moscow Institute of Steel and Alloys and received his Ph.D. in condensed matter physics in 1980. At the same university he was awarded his Habilitatus (Doctor of physical and mathematical sciences) in 1988.

== Professional career ==
From 1981 to 1999 he worked as a researcher, senior researcher (1985), associated (1987) and full professor (1990) at the Department of Theoretical Physics in Moscow Institute of Steel and Alloys. In 1993 he became an invited fellow at the Condensed Matter Theory Group of Argonne National Laboratory in United States and then starting from 1996 worked as an invited professor at first at the University of Rome Tor Vergata and then from 1997 to 2000 held the same position at both University of Bordeaux and the University of Florence. From 1999 to 2005 he was a visiting professor at the University of Minnesota and the Pavia. At the University of Rome Tor Vergata he is an adjunct professor to this day. Since 1999 he works as a research director at the Institute of Superconductors, Oxides and other Innovative Materials and Devices of the Italian National Research Council (SPIN-CNR).

In 2018 Andrey Varlamov and Andreas Glatz had written a what became known as the Perfect Pizza equation.

== Honorable titles ==
In 2009 he was elected as correspondent member of the Istituto Lombardo Accademia di Scienze e Lettere Brera. In 2011 he was awarded the degree of Doctor of Honoris Causa at the Bogolyubov Institute for Theoretical Physics. In 2014 he was honored with the degree of Doctor of Honoris Causa at the Mediterranean Institute of Fundamental Physics. Since 1985 he is a member of the Editorial Board (1986-1992 vice-editor-in-chief) of the popular scientific journal for students Kvant of the Russian Academy of Sciences.

== Awards ==
- 1971 – First Prize in the Vth International Physics Olympiad (IPhO)
- 1986 – Lenin Komsomol Prize in Physics (USSR State Prize for young scientists)
- 2015 – Le Prix Roberval Grand Public for the book Le kaleidoscope de la Physique (in co-authorship with Attilio Rigamonti and Jacques Villain)
- 2018 – Bogolyubov Prize of the Bogolyubov Institute for Theoretical Physics, Ukraine

== Books ==
- 1984 – Энциклопедический словарь юного физика
- 1987/2002/2005/2014/2017 - Удивительная физика
- 1997 – Fisica, che meraviglia!
- 1997 – Fluctuation Phenomena in High Temperature Superconductors
- 2001/2004/2012 Wonders of Physics
- 2002/2009 – The Physics of Superconductors
- 2005/2009 – Theory of Fluctuations in Superconductors
- 2007 – Теория флуктуаций в сверхпроводниках
- 2007 – Magico Caleidiscopio della Fisica
- 2011 – Fundamentals of Superconducting Nanoelectronics
- 2011 – Maravillas De La Fisica
- 2014 – Wonders of Physics (Chinese)
- 2014 – Le kaleidoscope de la Physique
- 2016 – Wonders of Physics I (Japanese)
- 2017 – Wonders of Physics II (Japanese)
- 2020 – Несамовита фізика. Скрипка, піца, вино і надпровідність
- 2023 – The Kaleidoscope of Physics

== Publications ==
- Andrey Varlamov publications indexed by Google Scholar
