= Nikolay Kudryavtsev =

Russian physicist

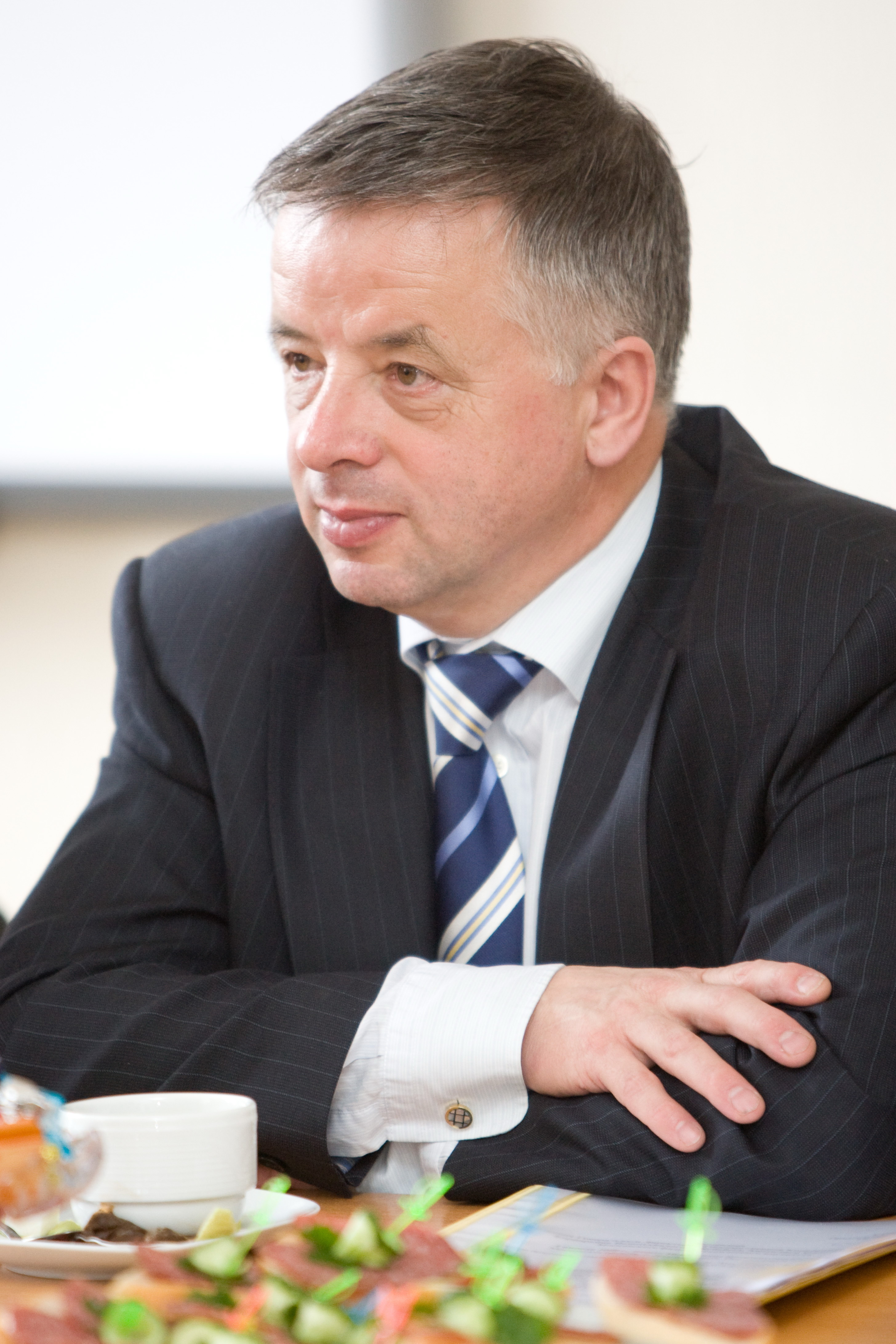
- Kudryavtsev in 2009
- Born: 8 May 1950 (age 76); Moscow, USSR
- Education: Moscow Institute of Physics and Technology
- Scientific career
- Fields: molecular physics, lasers, ecology
- Workplaces: rector at MIPT

Nikolay Kudryavtsev (Russian: Николай Николаевич Кудрявцев) is president of Moscow Institute of Physics and Technology.

== Career ==
Nikolay Kudryavtsev graduated from the Department of Molecular and Chemical Physics of the Moscow Institute of Physics and Technology in 1973. He received his Ph.D. in physics and mathematics from the same institute in 1977. Dr. Kudryavtsev worked at MIPT in various positions including Molecular Physics Chair and dean of the Department of Molecular and Chemical Physics. He became professor in 1990. Since June 1997 he serves as rector at Moscow Institute of Physics and Technology. In 2007 he was elected to Schlumberger Board of Directors. Professor Kudryavtsev is a member of the Russian Academy of Sciences.

In 2022, he signed the Address of the Russian Union of Rectors, which called to support Putin in his invasion of Ukraine.

== See also ==
- web site
- Moscow Institute of Physics and Technology
- Russian Academy of Sciences
- Schlumberger
