= Valentin Gapontsev =

Russian-American billionaire (1939–2021)

- Валентин Гапонцев
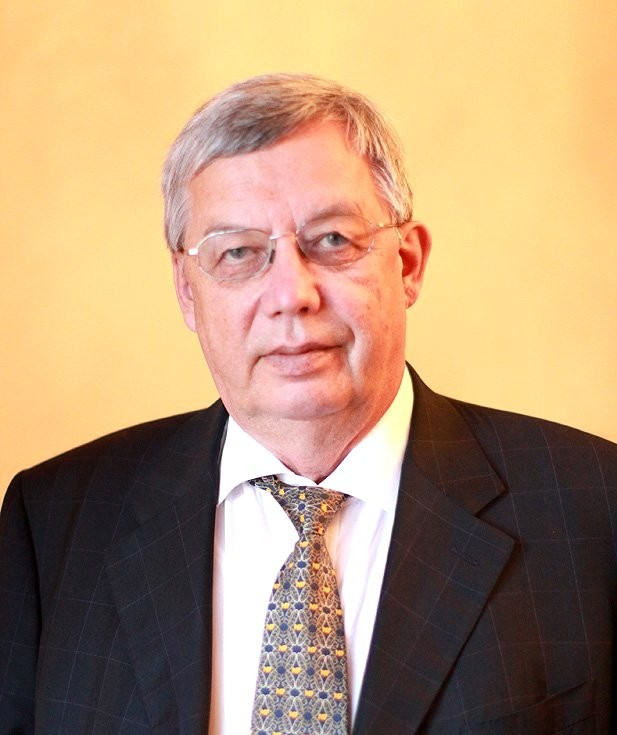
- Gapontsev in 2011
- Born: Valentin P. Gapontsev; 23 February 1939; Moscow, Russian SFSR, Soviet Union
- Died: 22 October 2021 (aged 82)
- Citizenship: Russian and American
- Education: Lviv Polytechnic National University; Moscow Institute of Physics and Technology
- Occupation: Laser physicist
- Known for: Founder, CEO and chairman, IPG Photonics
- Spouse: Married
- Children: 1

Valentin P. Gapontsev (23 February 1939 – 22 October 2021) was a Russian-American laser physicist, billionaire, and the founder, CEO, and chairman of IPG Photonics. At the time of his death, his net worth was estimated at US$2.3 billion.

== Early life ==
Valentin Gapontsev was born in Moscow, the son of an artillery captain. The family moved to Lviv in 1946, and he spent the next 20 years there. Graduating from the Lviv Polytechnic National University in 1961, he completed a doctoral program in the Moscow Institute of Physics and Technology.

== Career ==
After completing his doctorate, he joined the Soviet Academy of Sciences Institute of Radio-engineering and Electronics in 1967, where he specialized in laser material physics, researching synthesis of active gain medium materials.

In 1990, Gapontsev founded IPG Photonics at age 51. In a small laboratory near Moscow, he and his team invented a way to make fiber laser technology practical. His first contract was a $750,000 sale to Italtel, fulfilled by establishing IPG Laser GmbH factory in Burbach, which was employing 500 workers in 2011.

In mid-1990s, he expanded his business into the US by partnering with Dallas-based RELTEC Communications to produce 10,000 optical amplifiers for new BellSouth fiber network, which was being built to connect 5 millions of US households to Internet. IPG Photonics was incorporated in the US in 1998. After moving his firm to the US, he raised $100 million investment from Merrill Lynch and Apax Partners. IPG specializes in production of telecommunications and industrial high-power lasers. According to Forbes, Gapontsev's firm controlled 80% of the high-power fiber laser market in 2011. Its revenue reached $1.4 billion in 2017. Gapontsev and his family own 47.6% of IPG.

In 2011, Gapontsev received the Russian Federation National Award in Science and Technology.

In 2019, Gapontsev was erroneously sanctioned as a "Russian oligarch". The decision was later reversed by the US Treasury.

In 2020, Forbes ranked him No. 359 on the Forbes 400 of the richest people in America.

== Personal life ==
He was married, with one child, and lived in Worcester, Massachusetts.

Gapontsev died on 22 October 2021. The cause of death is unknown, but it is known that he had cancer. The official corporate memorial encourages donations to local surgical oncology and liver and pancreas research funds.
