= Vladimir Gapontsev =

Russian musician

- Владимир Гапонцев
- Born: September 6, 1985 (age 40); Volzhskiy, Soviet Union
- Education: Volgograd Municipal College of Arts, Serebryakov Institute of Arts (Volgograd)
- Occupation: Classical guitarist

Vladimir Gapontsev (Russian: Владимир Гапонцев; born 6 September 1985) is a Russian classical guitarist, specializing in solo and chamber music repertoire from the Baroque, Classical, Romantic, avant-garde, jazz, folk and pop genres.

== Biography ==
Gapontsev was born in Volzhskiy, Russia in 1985, and began to play the guitar at age 11. In 1997 he won a local guitar competition. In 2000 he entered the Volgograd Municipal College of Arts and in 2004 he continued his studies at guitar at Serebryakov Institute of Arts in Volgograd, studying under with Sergey Matokhin. During his studies he won prizes at many international guitar competitions in Russia and abroad and won scholarships from the Administration of Volgograd Region (2002), Ministry of Culture of Russian Federation (2003), Federal Agency of Culture and Cinematography ("Young talents of Russia", 2006).

Since 2005 he has been a regular participant of international master classes in Russia and Europe.

Gapontsev began teaching in 2006 as a classical and electric guitar teacher at the Serebryakov Institute. In 2010—2012 he was a guitar teacher at Igumnov music school, Moscow. In 2014, he is regularly invited as a performer, teacher and member of the jury to international festivals in Russia, Ukraine, Romania, Israel and other countries.

As a solo player and a chamber musician, Gapontsev has performed at venues such as Glinka state museum of musical art, Moscow Conservatoire Grand Hall, Central House of Journalist in Moscow, Vladimir Philharmonic Hall, S. Prokofiev museum, State Tretyakov gallery, Volgograd Central Concert Hall, Elena Obraztsova Cultural Center in Saint-Petersburg, Royal College of Music, London and others.

Besides solo recitals and teaching, he is also devoted to chamber music, arrangement and composing. Since 2012, Gapontsev has been a member of the Russian Guitar Quartet, a group of musicians concentrated on professional playing the original music of modern Russian composers. He also performs guitar concertos with symphonic orchestras in Russia and abroad, and collaborates with musicians of different styles including classics, jazz, bossa nova, and folk.

== Prizes ==
Year	Competition
2001	Regional Competition in Kamyshin
2002	V International competition of classical guitar performers in Belgorod)
2003	Guitar competition in Saratov (I prize)
2003	Music Colleges Students competition of South of Russia in Rostov-on-Don
2003	International guitar competition «Tabula Rasa», Volgograd (Grand Prix of competition)
2004	VIII International competition of young musicians in Togliatti
2004	VI International competition of classical guitar performers in Belgorod
2005	I international competition of guitar art «Git As», Kiev, Ukraine
2005	International Festival and Competition Il de Re, France)
2006	International Guitar Competition Kiev, Ukraine
2006	I International competition «Guitar Gems», Netania, Israel
2006	VII International competition of classical guitar performers in Belgorod
2007	International competition of chamber ensembles «Music without limits», Druskininkai, Litueva
2007	II International competition «Guitar Gems», Netania, Israel]. (I prize)
2007	III International guitar competition «Tabula Rasa», Volgograd
2009	I National guitar competition «Alexander Frauchi», Nizhniy Novgorod, Russia
2010	Baltic International video competition «Per Oktava» (I prize)
2010	International Sharpach guitar competition, Oberhausen, Germany
2010	International guitar competition «Eduard Pamfil», Bucharest, Romania
2011	International competition Sinaia, Romania
2013	International competition «Alexey Khorev», Saint Petersburg, Russia
