= IPG Photonics =

U.S. fiber laser company

IPG Photonics Corporation

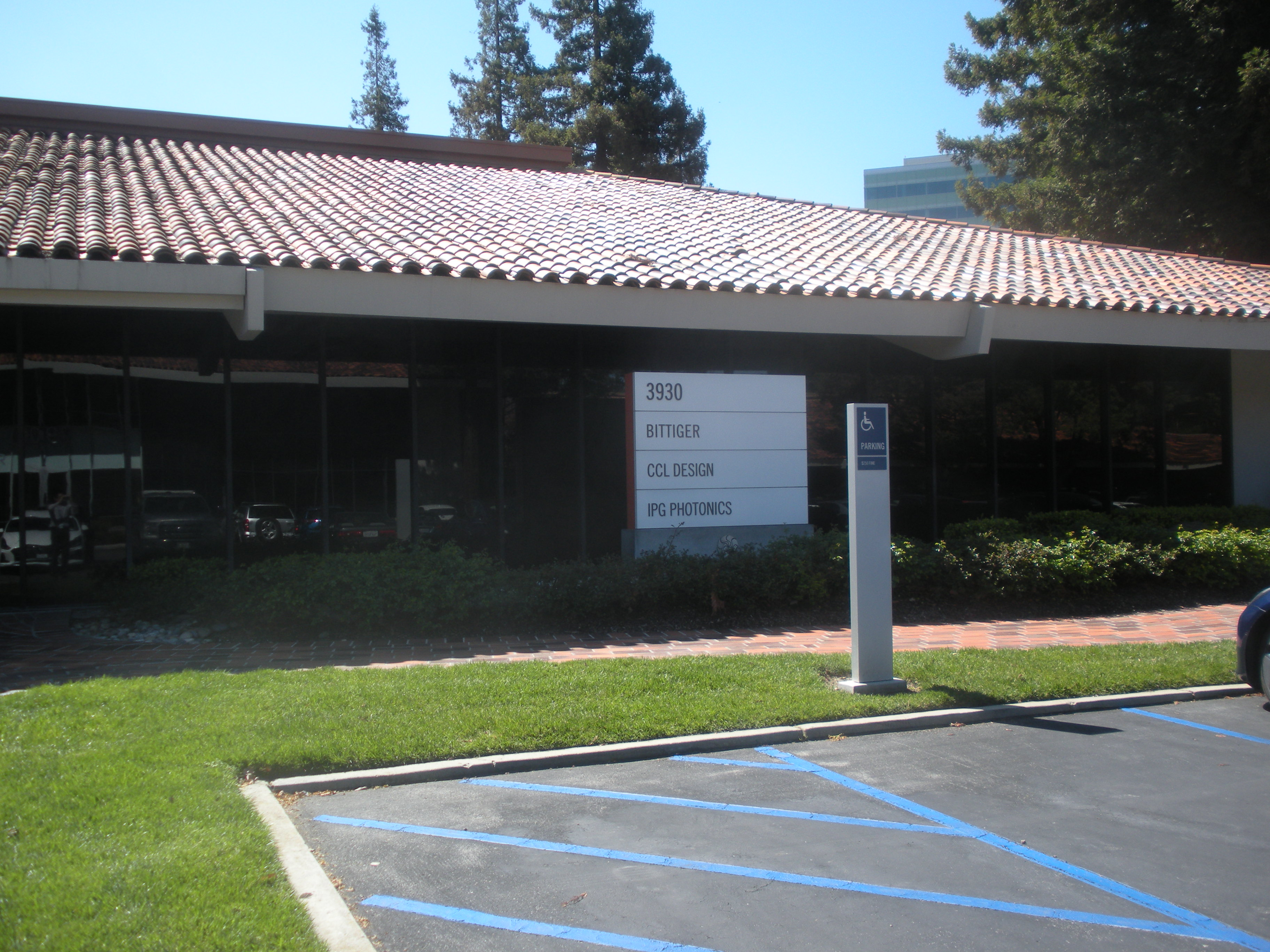
- Satellite office in Santa Clara, California
- Type: Public
- Traded as: Nasdaq: IPGP; S&P 400 component
- Industry: Photonics
- Founded: 1990; 36 years ago
- Headquarters: Marlborough, Massachusetts, U.S.
- Area served: Worldwide
- Key people: Mark M. Gitin (CEO)
- Products: Lasers, amplifiers and laser systems for materials processing, communications, entertainment, medical, biotechnology, scientific and advance applications.
- Revenue: ▲US$1.00 billion (2025)
- Operating income: ▲US$13.1 million (2025)
- Net income: ▲US$31.1 million (2025)
- Total assets: ▲US$2.42 billion (2025)
- Total equity: ▲US$2.13 billion (2025)
- Number of employees: 4,840 (2025)
- Website: ipgphotonics.com

IPG Photonics Corporation is an American manufacturer of fiber lasers. IPG Photonics developed and commercialized optical fiber lasers, which are used in a variety of applications including materials processing, medical applications and telecommunications. IPG has manufacturing facilities in the United States, Germany, and Italy.

IPG was founded in 1990 by Valentin P. Gapontsev, IPG's Executive Chairman and former chief executive officer, and Igor Samartsev, IPG's Chief Technology Officer.

IPG also develops and manufactures fiber amplifiers, diode lasers and several complementary products used with its lasers, such as optical delivery cables, fiber couplers, and beam switches. Its products are sold globally and primarily used for materials processing, advanced technologies, telecommunications, and medical applications.

The company is headquartered in Marlborough, Massachusetts, with more than 25 facilities around the world.

== History ==
IPG was founded in 1990 in Russia by physicist Valentin Gapontsev.

Building on previous demonstrations to improve the efficiencies of fiber lasers, in 1990, Valentin Gapontsev and Igor Samartsev first proposed using fiber laser technology to produce a high power laser beam, demonstrating 2W CW Er doped fiber lasers at 1.54μm and a 5W laser in 1991. Using a side-pumping technique, Gapontsev and Samartsev's unique fiber laser architecture enabled many semiconductor laser diodes to pump through one single-mode fiber.

This created a high power, near infrared (1064-1070nm) laser, with single mode beam quality. This discovery also resulted in high power optical amplifiers. Optical amplifiers convert a small light signal into a powerful beam, often a thousand times brighter, but otherwise identical to the original signal. In 2018, these amplifiers were used in telecommunications and Internet networks to transmit data over optical fiber and free space.

=== NTO IRE-Polus ===
In December 1991, Gapontsev and Alexander Shestakov founded NTO IRE-Polus. The company was based in Fryazino, Russia. Shestakov left the company in 1994. Gapontsev started using the acronym IPG to refer to his company. It stood for IRE-Polus Group.

In 1993, IPG won a contract with Italtel, a large Italian telecommunications carrier. IPG developed a 200 mW erbium doped amplifier for Italtel, which became IPG's first marketable product. IPG then developed erbium fiber amplifiers using a new pump design and fiber solution. In order to introduce the technology to the market, Italtel convinced Gapontsev to transfer component production to Italy. This became IPG's first European subsidiary.

In 1994, Daimler Benz Aerospace (DBA), a German company, hired IPG to create a laser-based obstacle warning system for a helicopter. DBA funded IPG's development of a new fiber laser based solution. IPG opened a manufacturing and research facility in Berlin to develop the transmitter. A year later, IPG opened a facility near Frankfurt.

In 1996, IPG launched industrial-quality, diffraction-limited (single mode) 10-W fiber lasers. IPG continued developing new products and selling them to customers in Japan, the United States, and Europe.

In 2024, IPG sold its entire interest in IRE-Polus. The sale completed IPG's exit from all facilities in Russia following Russia's invasion of Ukraine.

=== US subsidiary ===
In 1998, IPG established the IPG Photonics Corporation headquartered in Oxford, Massachusetts.

By 2000, IPG was a $52 million company. Its customers included Alcatel, Fujitsu, Lucent, Siemens, and Marconi (Reltec). During this time, IPG started developing its multi-kilowatt diode-pumped fiber lasers.

In 2000, IPG introduced a 100-W diffraction-limited fiber laser using its multi-fiber side-coupling technology. In comparison, the conventional diode-pumped solid-state lasers (DPSSLs) on the market used diode bars as the pump source, with each bar typically producing 40 W of power.

By the end of 2000, capital spending by telecommunications providers was reduced and IPG revenue from communications applications declined. IPG invested much of its remaining capital in the development of: (1) high-power industrial fiber lasers; (2) mass production lines; and (3) semiconductor pump laser diode technology. IPG pursued raising the maximum wattage of fiber laser technology.

Between 2002 and 2003, IPG developed multi-kW industrial class fiber lasers. This was accomplished by combining the output beams of several 100-W fiber lasers.

In 2006, IPG raised more than $90 million, net of proceeds, in an initial public offering. The company continued to expand, opening offices near Detroit, Michigan in 2006, Beijing, China in 2007, and its Silicon Valley Technology Center in San Jose, California in 2010.

Beginning in 2010, the company introduced its first quasi-continuous wave (QCW) lasers into the market.

IPG's Oxford facility was expanded to include a new production facility in 2013.

In 2017, worldwide IPG revenue grew to $1.4 billion, a 40% increase over the previous year. In 2018 the company was added to the S&P 500 stock market index.

In late 2018, IPG acquired Genesis Systems, a robotic integration company.

IPG announced the release of the LightWELD 1500, a handheld laser welding system, late in 2020.

In 2021, Valentin Gapontsev stepped down as chief executive officer, retaining a position as Executive Chairman of the company. Then, Eugene Scherbakov succeeded Dr. Gapontsev as IPG's CEO. On April 30, 2024, Mark M. Gitin was appointed as the current chief executive officer.

=== Canadian Subsidiary ===
In late 2017, IPG announced the acquisition of Laser Depth Dynamics, a provider of an optical coherence tomography-based in-process quality monitoring and control solutions for laser-based welding applications. The subsidiary operates as IPG Photonics (Canada) Inc. and is located in Kingston, Ontario.

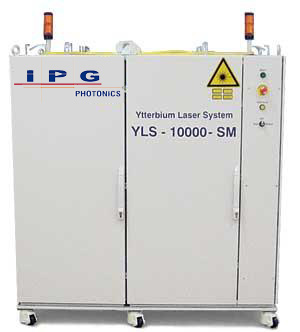
A 10 kW ytterbium-doped fiber laser manufactured by IPG Photonics
