= Kapitza's pendulum =

Rigid pendulum

Drawing showing how a Kapitza pendulum can be constructed: a motor rotates a crank at a high speed, the crank vibrates a lever arm up and down, which the pendulum is attached to with a pivot.

Kapitza's pendulum or Kapitza pendulum is a rigid pendulum in which the pivot point vibrates in a vertical direction, up and down. It is named after Russian Nobel Prize laureate physicist Pyotr Kapitza, who in 1951 developed a theory which successfully explains some of its unusual properties. The unique feature of the Kapitza pendulum is that the vibrating suspension can cause it to balance stably in an inverted position, with the bob above the suspension point. In the usual pendulum with a fixed suspension, the only stable equilibrium position is with the bob hanging below the suspension point; the inverted position is a point of unstable equilibrium, and the smallest perturbation moves the pendulum out of equilibrium. In nonlinear control theory the Kapitza pendulum is used as an example of a parametric oscillator that demonstrates the concept of "dynamic stabilization".

The pendulum was first described by Andrew Stephenson in 1908, who found that the upper vertical position of the pendulum might be stable when the driving frequency is fast. Yet until the 1950s there was no explanation for this highly unusual and counterintuitive phenomenon. Pyotr Kapitza was the first to analyze it in 1951. He carried out a number of experimental studies and as well provided an analytical insight into the reasons of stability by splitting the motion into "fast" and "slow" variables and by introducing an effective potential. This innovative work created a new subject in physics – vibrational mechanics. Kapitza's method is used for description of periodic processes in atomic physics, plasma physics and cybernetical physics. The effective potential which describes the "slow" component of motion is described in "Mechanics" volume (§30) of Landau's Course of Theoretical Physics.

Another interesting feature of the Kapitza pendulum system is that the bottom equilibrium position, with the pendulum hanging down below the pivot, is no longer stable. Any tiny deviation from the vertical increases in amplitude with time. Parametric resonance can also occur in this position, and chaotic regimes can be realized in the system when strange attractors are present in the Poincaré section.

== Notation ==
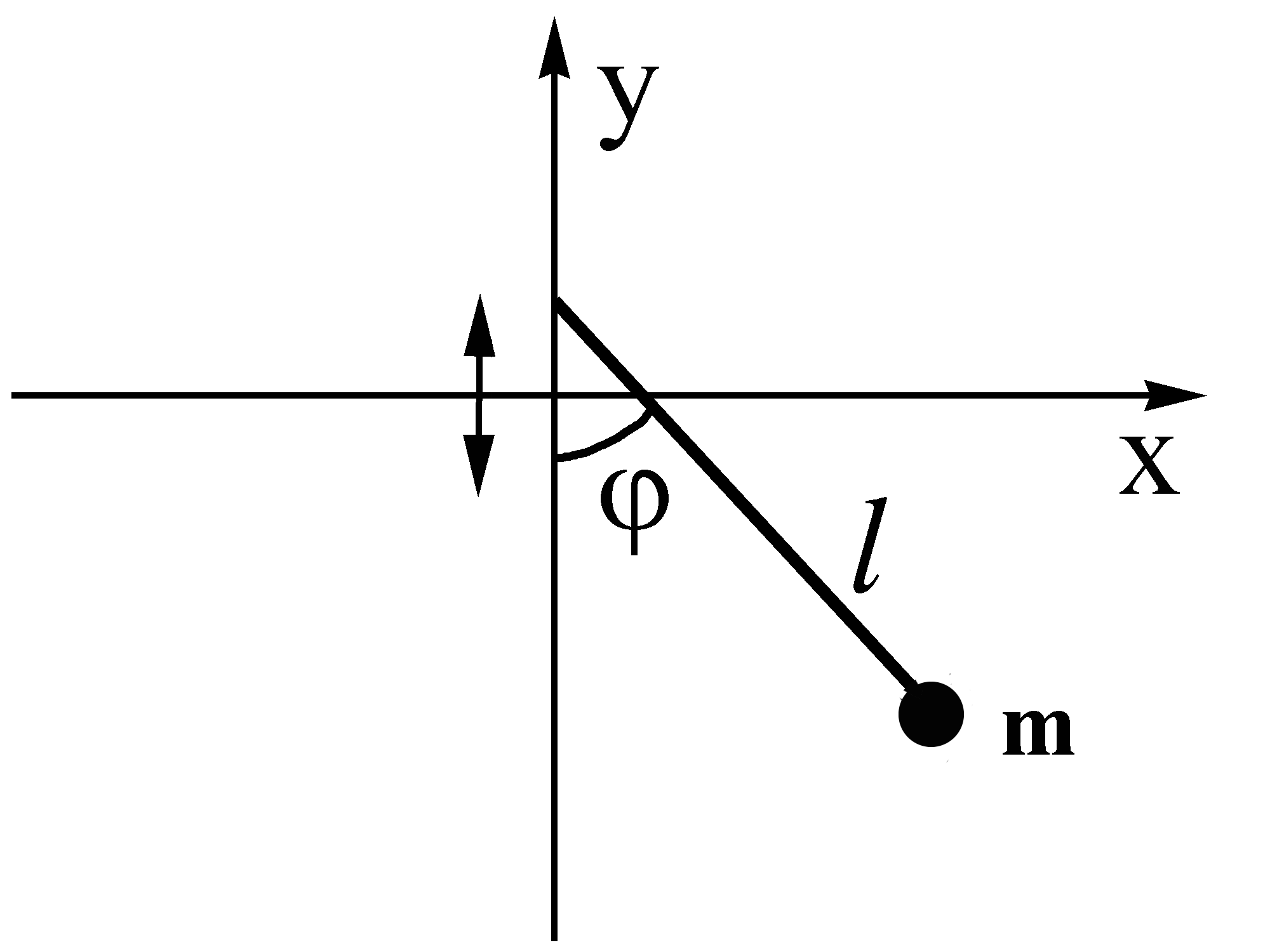
Kapitza's pendulum scheme

Denote the vertical axis as $y$ and the horizontal axis as $x$ so that the motion of pendulum happens in the ($x$-$y$) plane. The following notation will be used

- $g$ — free fall acceleration,
- $l$ — length of rigid and light pendulum,
- $m$ — mass of the (idealized, mathematical) pendulum,
- $\nu$—frequency of the vertical oscillations of the suspension,
- $a$ — amplitude of the oscillations of the suspension,
- $\omega_0 = \sqrt{g/l}$ — proper frequency of the mathematical pendulum.

Denoting the angle between pendulum and downward direction as $\varphi$ the time dependence of the position of pendulum gets written as

$$\begin{cases}
x &= l \sin \varphi\\
y &= - l \cos \varphi - a \cos \nu t
\end{cases}$$

== Energy ==
The potential energy of the pendulum is due to gravity and is defined by, in terms of the vertical position, as

$$E_\mathrm{POT} = m g y = - m g (l \cos \varphi + a \cos \nu t). \,$$

The kinetic energy includes, in addition to the standard term $E_\mathrm{KIN}=m l^2 \dot \varphi^2 /2$ for the velocity of a mathematical pendulum, a contribution due to vibrations of the suspension and a cross-term

$$E_\mathrm{KIN}
= \frac{m l^2 }{2} \dot \varphi^2 + m a l \nu ~\sin(\nu t) \sin(\varphi)~\dot\varphi + \frac{m a^2 \nu^2}{2} \sin^2(\nu t)\;.$$

The total energy is given by the sum of the kinetic and potential energies $E = E_\mathrm{KIN} + E_\mathrm{POT}$ and the Lagrangian by their difference $L = E_\mathrm{KIN} - E_\mathrm{POT}$.

The total energy is conserved in a mathematical pendulum, so time $t$ dependence of the potential $E_\mathrm{POT}$ and kinetic $E_\mathrm{KIN}$ energies is symmetric with respect to the horizontal line. According to the virial theorem the mean kinetic and potential energies in harmonic oscillator are equal. This means that the line of symmetry corresponds to half of the total energy.

In the case of vibrating suspension the system is no longer closed and the total energy is no longer conserved. The kinetic energy is more sensitive to vibration compared to the potential one. The potential energy is bound from below and above $-mg(l+a) \leq E_\mathrm{POT} \leq mg(l+a)$ while the kinetic energy is bound only from below $E_\mathrm{KIN}\ge 0$. For high frequency of vibrations $\nu$ the kinetic energy can be large compared to the potential energy.

== Equations of motion ==
Motion of pendulum satisfies Euler–Lagrange equations. The dependence of the phase $\varphi$ of the pendulum on its position satisfies the equation:

$$\frac{d}{dt} \frac{\partial L}{\partial \dot \varphi} = \frac{\partial L}{\partial \varphi},$$

where the Lagrangian $L$ reads

$$L =  \frac{m l^2 }{2} \dot \varphi^2 + ml( g  + a~\nu^2\cos\nu t) \cos \varphi,$$

up to irrelevant total time derivative terms. The differential equation

$$\ddot \varphi = - (g+a~\nu^2\cos\nu t) \frac{\sin \varphi}{l},$$

which describes the movement of the pendulum is nonlinear due to the $\sin\varphi$ factor.

== Equilibrium positions ==
Kapitza's pendulum model is more general than the simple pendulum. The Kapitza model reduces to the latter in the limit $a = 0$. In that limit, the tip of the pendulum describes a circle: $x^2+y^2 = l^2 = \text{constant}$. If the energy in the initial moment is larger than the maximum of the potential energy $E > mgl$ then the trajectory will be closed and cyclic. If the initial energy is smaller $E < mgl$ then the pendulum will oscillate close to the only stable point $(x,y) = (0,-l)$.

When the suspension is vibrating with a small amplitude $a \ll l$ and with a frequency $\nu\gg \omega_0$ much higher than the proper frequency $\omega_0$, the angle $\varphi$ may be viewed as a superposition $\varphi=\varphi_0+\xi$ of a "slow" component $\varphi_0$ and a rapid oscillation $\xi$ with small amplitude due to the small but rapid vibrations of the suspension. Technically, we perform a perturbative expansion in the "coupling constants" $(a/l),(\omega_0/\nu) \ll 1$ while treating the ratio $(a/l)(\nu/\omega_0)$ as fixed. The perturbative treatment becomes exact in the double scaling limit $a \to 0 ,\nu\to \infty$. More precisely, the rapid oscillation $\xi$ is defined as

$$\xi = \frac{a}{l}\sin\varphi_0 ~\cos\nu t. \,$$

The equation of motion for the "slow" component $\varphi_0$ becomes

$$\begin{align}
\ddot\varphi_0 = \ddot\varphi - \ddot\xi  &=  -(g+a~\nu^2\cos\nu t)\frac{\sin\varphi}{l} \\
& {}\quad{} - \frac{a}{l}\left(\ddot\varphi_0 \cos \varphi_0 ~\cos\nu t -\dot\varphi_0^2\sin\varphi_0 ~\cos\nu t - 2\nu\dot\varphi_0\cos\varphi_0~\sin\nu t - \nu^2\sin \varphi_0 ~\cos\nu t \right) \\[8pt]
&= -\frac{g}{l}\sin\varphi_0 -(g+a~\nu^2\cos\nu t) \frac{1}{l}\left(\xi\cos\varphi_0 + O(\xi^2)\right) \\
& {}\quad{} - \frac{a}{l}\left( \ddot\varphi_0 \cos\varphi_0 ~\cos\nu t -\dot\varphi_0^2\sin\varphi_0 ~\cos\nu t - 2\nu\dot\varphi_0\cos\varphi_0~\sin\nu t \right).
\end{align}$$

Time-averaging over the rapid $\nu$-oscillation yields to leading order

$$\ddot \varphi_0   = - \frac{g}{l}\sin \varphi_0 - \frac{1}{2}\left(\frac{a\nu}{l}\right)^2\sin \varphi_0 \cos \varphi_0.$$

The "slow" equation of motion becomes

$$m l^2\ddot \varphi_0 = -\frac{\partial V_{\mathrm{eff}}}{\partial \varphi_0}  \;,$$

by introducing an effective potential

$$V_{\mathrm{eff}} = - mgl \cos \varphi_0 + m \left(\frac{a\nu}{2}\sin \varphi_0\right)^2.$$

It turns out that the effective potential $V_{\mathrm{eff}}$ has two minima if $(a\nu)^2 > 2gl$, or equivalently, $(a/l)(\nu/\omega_0) > \sqrt{2}$. The first minimum is in the same position $(x,y)=(0,-l)$ as the mathematical pendulum and the other minimum is in the upper vertical position $(x,y)=(0,l)$. As a result the upper vertical position, which is unstable in a mathematical pendulum, can become stable in Kapitza's pendulum.

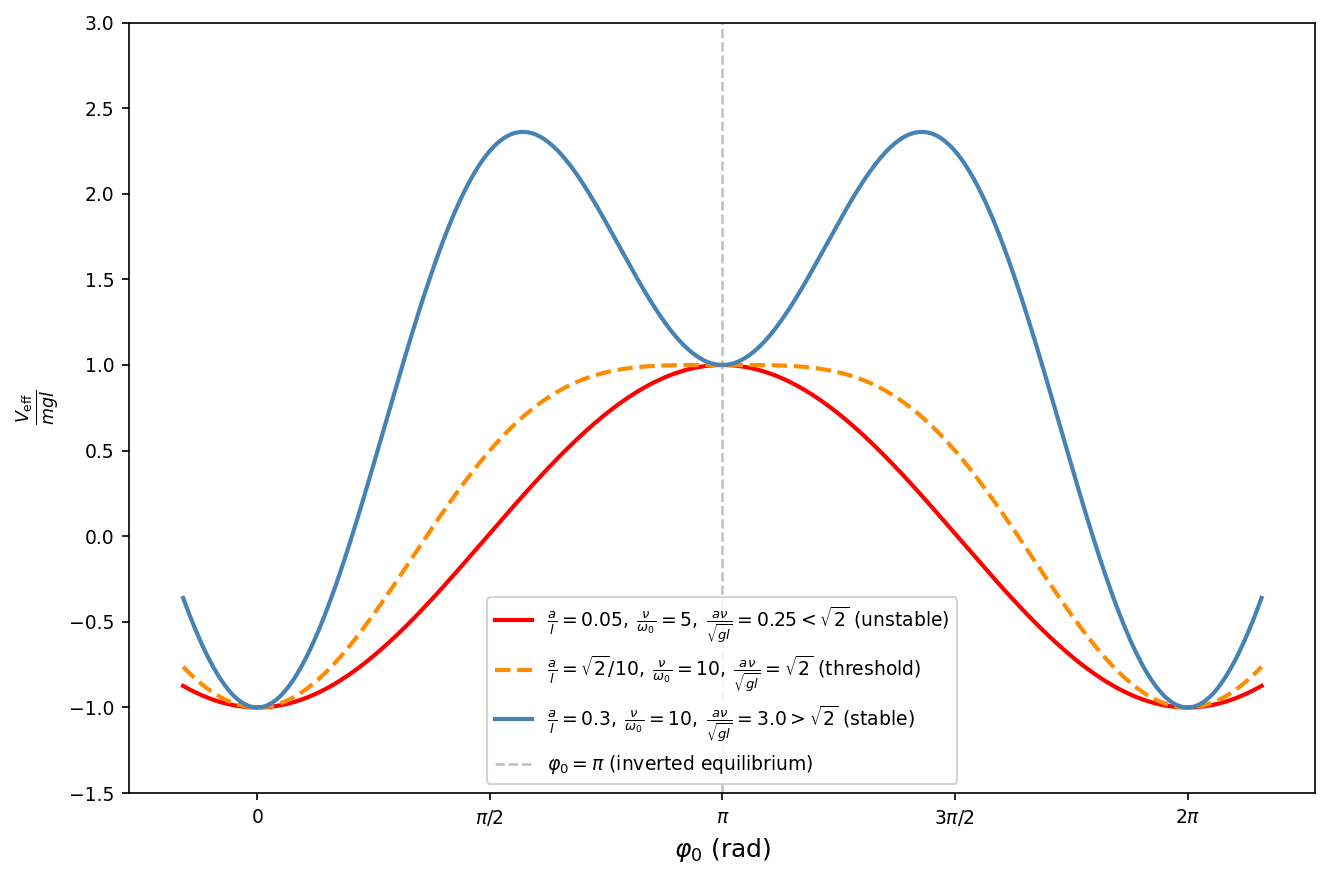
Effective potential

== Bifurcation and chaos ==
For fixed forcing frequency $\nu$, and increasing forcing amplitude $a$, the inverted point $\varphi = \pi$ becomes a stable equilibrium, and then it would become unstable again. The point undergoes a Hopf bifurcation: the stable equilibrium expands into a stable oscillation around $\varphi = \pi$, at frequency $\nu /2$, and amplitude $\propto \sqrt{a - a_c}$ where $a_c$ is the critical amplitude.

For even larger amplitude, the stable oscillation becomes unstable, and the pendulum would start rotating. At even larger amplitudes, the rotating mode is also destroyed, and a strange attractor appears by period-doubling cascade.

== Rotating solutions ==
The rotating solutions of the Kapitza's pendulum occur when the pendulum rotates around the pivot point at the same frequency that the pivot point is driven. There are two rotating solutions, one for a rotation in each direction. We shift to the rotating reference frame using $\varphi \rightarrow \varphi^{\prime} \pm \nu t$ and the equation for $\varphi$ becomes:

$$\ddot \varphi^{\prime} = -\frac{1}{l} \left[ \frac{1}{2}a \nu^{2} \sin(\varphi^{\prime}) + g\sin(\varphi^{\prime} \pm \nu t) + \frac{1}{2}a \nu^{2} \sin(\varphi^{\prime} \pm 2\nu t) \right] \;.$$

Again considering the limit in which $\nu$ is much higher than the proper frequency $\omega_0$, we find that the rapid-$\nu$ slow-$\varphi_0^{\prime}$ limit leads to the equation:

$$\ddot \varphi_0^{\prime} = -\frac{1}{2l} a \nu^2 \sin\varphi_0^{\prime} \;.$$

The effective potential is just that of a simple pendulum equation. There is a stable equilibrium at $\varphi_0^{\prime} = 0$ and an unstable equilibrium at $\varphi_0^{\prime} = \pi$.

== Phase portrait ==
Interesting phase portraits might be obtained in regimes which are not accessible within analytic descriptions, for example in the case of large amplitude of the suspension $a \approx l$. Increasing the amplitude of driving oscillations to half of the pendulum length $a = l/2$ leads to the phase portrait shown in the figure.

Further increase of the amplitude to $a\approx l$ leads to full filling of the internal points of the phase space: if before some points of the phase space were not accessible, now system can reach any of the internal points. This situation holds also for larger values of $a$.

== Interesting facts ==
- Kapitza noted that a pendulum clock with a vibrating pendulum suspension always goes faster than a clock with a fixed suspension.
- Walking is defined by an 'inverted pendulum' gait in which the body vaults over the stiff limb or limbs with each step. Increased stability during walking might be related to stability of Kapitza's pendulum. This applies regardless of the number of limbs - even arthropods with six, eight or more limbs.
