= Kapitza number =

Dimensionless parameter in fluid mechanics

The Kapitza number (Ka) is a dimensionless number named after the prominent Russian physicist Pyotr Kapitsa (Peter Kapitza). He provided the first extensive study of the ways in which a thin film of liquid flows down inclined surfaces. Expressed as the ratio of surface tension forces to inertial forces, the Kapitza number acts as an indicator of the hydrodynamic wave regime in falling liquid films. Liquid film behavior represents a subset of the more general class of free boundary problems. and is important in a wide range of engineering and technological applications such as evaporators, heat exchangers, absorbers, microreactors, small-scale electronics/microprocessor cooling schemes, air conditioning and gas turbine blade cooling.

After World War II Kapitza was removed from all his positions, including director of his Institute for Physical Problems, for refusing to work on nuclear weapons. He was at his country house and devised experiments to work on there, including his experiments on falling films of liquid.

Unlike most dimensionless numbers used in the study of fluid mechanics, the Kapitza number represents a material property, as it is formed by combining powers of the surface tension, density, gravitational acceleration and kinematic viscosity.

$$\mathrm{Ka}=\frac{\sigma}{\rho(g\sin\beta)^{1/3}\nu^{4/3}}$$

where σ is the surface tension (SI units: N/m), g is gravitational acceleration (m/s^{2}), ρ is density (kg/m^{3}), β is inclination angle (rad), and ν is kinematic viscosity (m^{2}/s).
