= Anatoly Alexandrov (physicist) =

Russian physicist (1903–1994)

- Анатолий Александров
- Alexandrov in 1976
- Born: Anatoly Petrovich Alexandrov; 13 February 1903; Tarashcha, Kiev Governorate, Russian Empire (now Ukraine)
- Died: February 3, 1994 (aged 90); Moscow, Russia
- Resting place: Mitinskoe Cemetery
- Siglum: A. P. Alexandrov
- Education: Kiev University
- Known for: Soviet atomic bomb project Nuclear marine propulsion
- Awards: Lomonosov Gold Medal; Hero of Socialist Labor; Lenin Prize; Stalin Prize
- Scientific career
- Fields: Physics
- Workplaces: Laboratory No. 2 Institute for Physical Problems; Leningrad Polytechnic Institute; Kiev Institute of Health
- Thesis: Relaxation in Polymers (1941)
- Doctoral students: Yuri Semenovich Lazurkin
- Website: A.P Alexandrov

Anatoly Petrovich Alexandrov (Russian: Анато́лий Петро́вич Алекса́ндров; 13 February [O.S. 31 January] 1903 – 3 February 1994) was a Soviet physicist who played a leading role in the Soviet atomic bomb project and in the development of nuclear reactors for power stations, submarines and icebreakers. During the Second World War, he led the work on protecting Soviet ships from magnetic mines, together with Igor Kurchatov. He headed the Institute for Physical Problems from 1946, and the Kurchatov Institute from 1960 to 1988.

From 1975 to 1986, Alexandrov was president of the Academy of Sciences of the Soviet Union. He resigned the presidency after the Chernobyl disaster, which involved an RBMK reactor developed under his scientific leadership. He was a three-time Hero of Socialist Labour.

== Early life and education ==
Alexandrov was born on 13 February [O.S. 31 January] 1903 in Tarashcha, in the Kiev Governorate of the Russian Empire. His father, Pyotr Pavlovich Alexandrov, was a justice of the peace in Tarashcha, and after retiring in 1913 he worked as a teacher and private tutor. His mother, Ella Eduardovna Klasson, died in 1906, and the children were brought up by their grandmother. Alexandrov had an older sister, Valeria, and an older brother, Boris. The family moved to Kiev, where he attended a real school.

Alexandrov finished the Kiev real school at the end of 1919, during the Russian Civil War. According to his biographer Nikolai Bodrikhin, he then probably went to the front and fought on the side of Wrangel's White army, although no documents on his part in the fighting survive. The museum of the Ioffe Institute states that he served in Wrangel's army and received combat awards.

From 1920, Alexandrov worked as an electrician at the Kiev Physico-Chemical Society, and from 1922 he taught at labour schools. On 1 March 1924, he became a physics teacher at Kiev labour school No. 79, and in the same year he entered the faculty of physics and mathematics of Kiev University. To help support his family, he also tutored secondary school pupils in physics and chemistry. While still a student, he began research at the Kiev X-ray Institute, and he published his first scientific paper in 1929. He received his diploma from the Kiev Institute of National Education, as the university was then called, on 19 December 1929.

== Scientific career ==
=== Leningrad Physico-Technical Institute ===
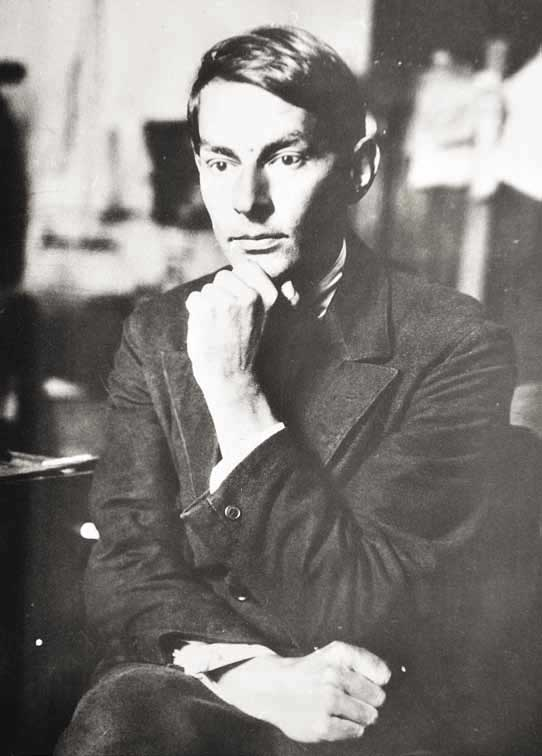
Alexandrov in 1931

Kurchatov met Alexandrov during a visit to Kiev in 1930 and recommended him to Abram Ioffe. In September 1930, at Ioffe's invitation, Alexandrov moved to Leningrad to work at the Leningrad Physico-Technical Institute (LFTI). From the spring of 1931, he also taught general physics at the Leningrad Industrial Institute, where he later headed a laboratory and became a docent in 1934.

His early research concerned the electrical strength of insulating films. His experiments showed that breakdown was governed by weak spots in the material, an idea that was later applied to brittle fracture and led to the statistical theory of brittle strength that he developed with Sergei Zhurkov. From 1931 to 1941, he and Pavel Kobeko led a broad programme of research on the physics of polymers. This work linked the mechanical and electrical relaxation processes in polymers, and it also helped in the development of frost-resistant rubber. He defended his doctoral dissertation, "Relaxation in polymers", on 27 June 1941.

=== Degaussing of ships ===
In 1936, Alexandrov began to lead the work at LFTI on protecting warships from magnetic mines and torpedoes. He developed the method with B. A. Gaev and A. A. Kartikovsky, and they received an author's certificate for it on 7 March 1938. On 31 December 1940, the Main Military Council of the Soviet Navy ordered the LFTI system to be fitted to all ships of the fleet.

After the German invasion of the Soviet Union, an order of 27 June 1941 set up brigades to install the degaussing equipment urgently. From 9 to 30 August 1941, Alexandrov and Kurchatov worked in Sevastopol on degaussing the ships of the Black Sea Fleet. The method was developed together with Kurchatov and Vladimir Tuchkevich. Alexandrov later regarded this as the most important work of his life. His colleagues credited it with helping the Soviet Navy to operate effectively and with saving the lives of many sailors. In 1942, Alexandrov received a Stalin Prize of the first degree for the work. He also invented an electric-arc cutter, known as "Som", for cutting anti-submarine nets.

=== Soviet atomic project ===
In 1943, Kurchatov brought Alexandrov into the Soviet atomic project. He was elected a corresponding member of the Academy of Sciences of the Soviet Union on 29 September 1943. He was first assigned to isotope separation, which led him to the reactors that produced plutonium for nuclear weapons. In 1948, he became a deputy head of Laboratory No. 2 and scientific head of the industrial plutonium-production reactors. According to A. Yu. Gagarinsky, 13 such reactors were built between 1948 and 1965.

On 17 August 1946, Alexandrov was appointed director of the Institute for Physical Problems, replacing Pyotr Kapitsa. He was elected a full member of the Academy of Sciences on 23 October 1953. He was released from the directorship of the Institute for Physical Problems in February 1954, and in March 1955 he returned to Kurchatov's laboratory as a deputy head. In 1955, he became deputy director of the Institute of Atomic Energy, as the laboratory was then renamed.

=== Nuclear fleet ===
In August 1952, Alexandrov, Kurchatov and Nikolai Dollezhal proposed building a Soviet nuclear submarine. Stalin approved the work in September 1952, and Alexandrov became the scientific head of the project. The first Soviet nuclear submarine, K-3, was launched in 1957. Alexandrov also led the work on the reactors for the nuclear icebreaker Lenin, the first nuclear-powered surface ship, which entered service in December 1959. He supervised the start-up of both the submarine's and the icebreaker's reactors. Power plants for the later icebreakers Arktika and Sibir were also developed under his leadership. Gagarinsky has called him the "father" of the Soviet nuclear fleet.

=== Kurchatov Institute ===
After Kurchatov's death, Alexandrov was appointed director of the Institute of Atomic Energy in February 1960. Under his leadership, the institute also worked on plasma physics, controlled thermonuclear fusion, solid-state physics, superconductivity and molecular genetics. In the 1960s, he oversaw the construction of a large plant for liquefying helium. He was a member of the presidium of the Academy of Sciences from 1960. In 1970, he helped to deal with a reactor accident at the Krasnoye Sormovo shipyard in Gorky.

Alexandrov was the scientific head of the Soviet Union's two main types of power reactor, the VVER pressurized water reactor and the RBMK graphite-moderated reactor. The first VVER unit at the Novovoronezh Nuclear Power Plant was started up under his leadership in 1964. Water-water reactors of this type were also built at the Rheinsberg Nuclear Power Plant in East Germany. According to Gagarinsky, the RBMK went into series production without a prototype, a decision that he links to the reactor's design flaws. Alexandrov remained director of the institute until December 1988, when he became its honorary director.

== President of the Academy of Sciences ==
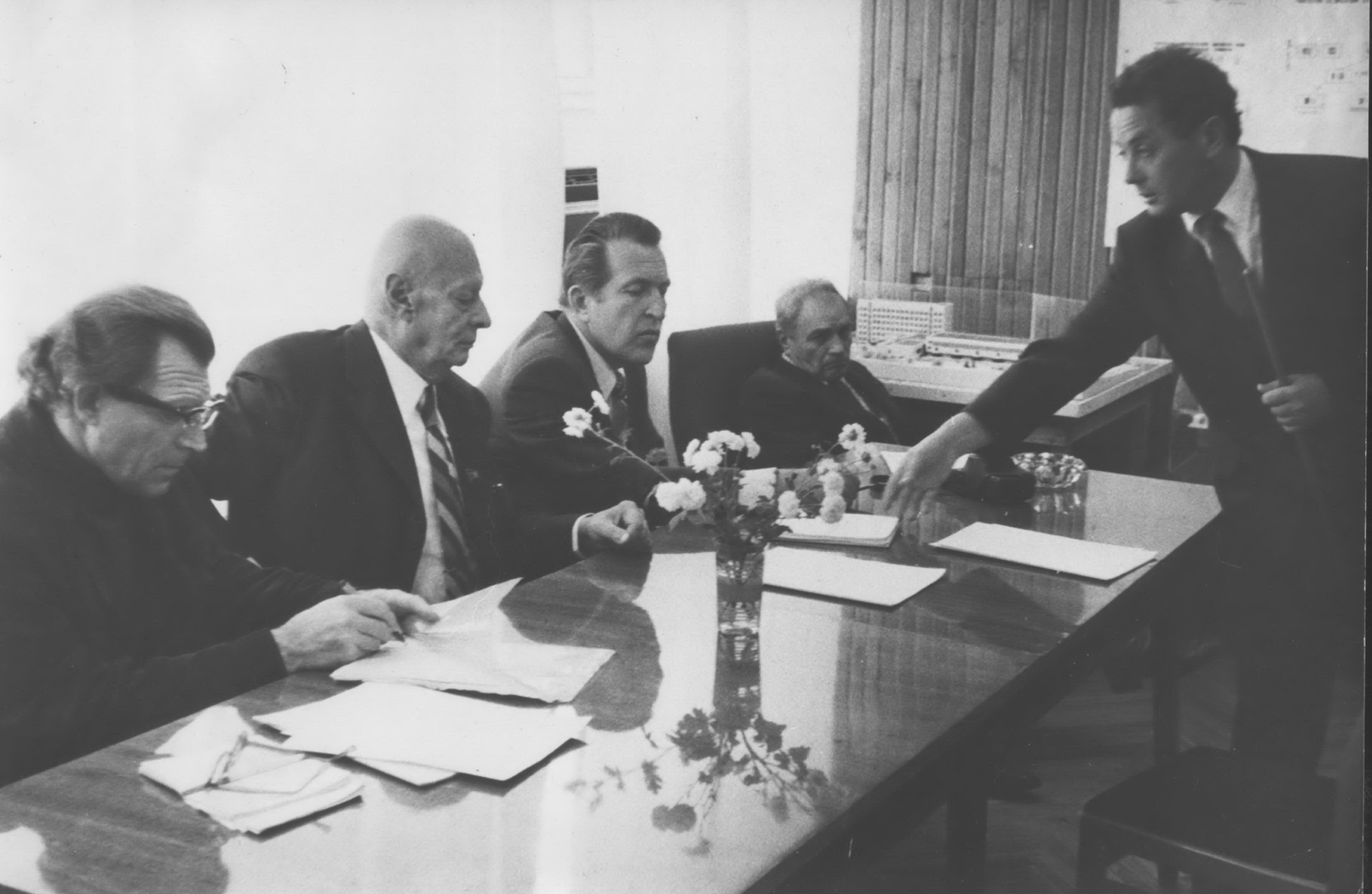
Alexandrov (second from left) during a meeting in Vladivostok (1988)

On 25 November 1975, Alexandrov was elected president of the Academy of Sciences of the Soviet Union, succeeding Mstislav Keldysh. His son Pyotr recalled that he very much did not want the post. In a 1990 interview with Ogonyok, Alexandrov said that he had been morally unprepared for the presidency and had accepted it after Keldysh persuaded him. He agreed on condition that he remained director of the Kurchatov Institute, and he declined the president's salary. As president, he chaired the committee on Lenin and State Prizes. He supported research in microelectronics, laser technology and synchrotron radiation. He was re-elected for a second term.

During his presidency, the physicist Andrei Sakharov was exiled to Gorky. In the 1990 interview, Alexandrov called the exile unjust, but said that he and Keldysh had not been able to have it revoked. He also said that the academy had not expelled Sakharov despite pressure to do so, and that Sakharov's return from Gorky had been "a great joy" to him.

== Chernobyl disaster ==
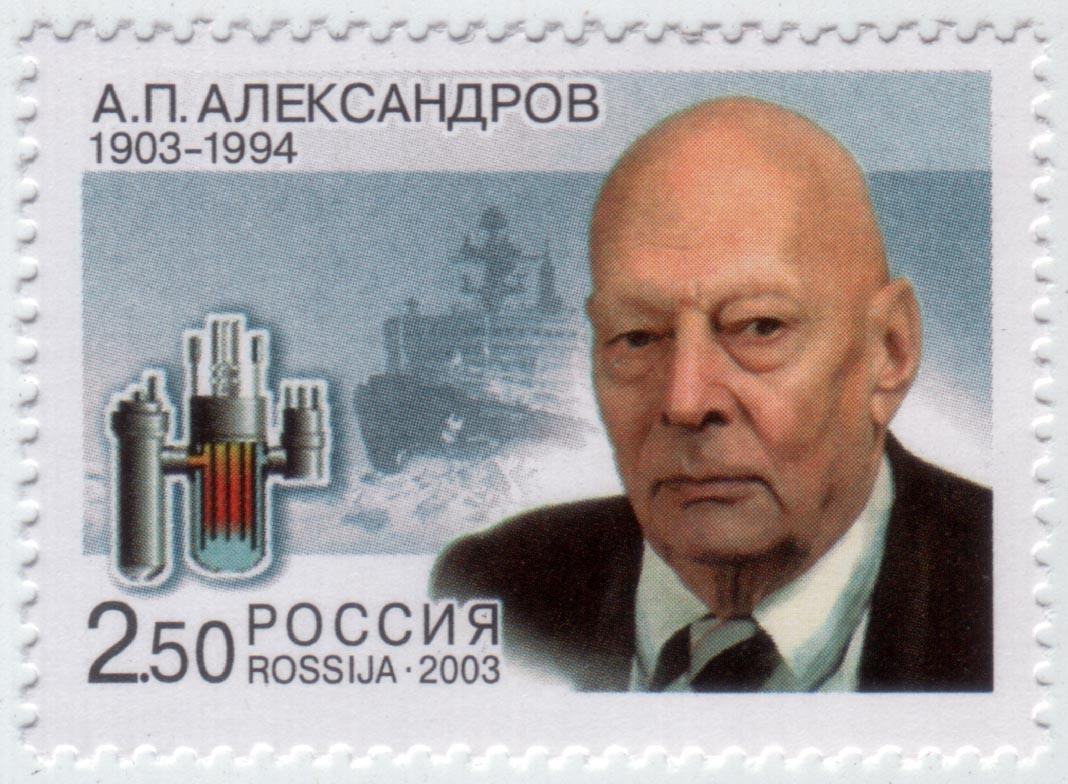
2003 Russian stamp commemorating Alexandrov

After the Chernobyl disaster of April 1986, Alexandrov set up a crisis headquarters at the Kurchatov Institute, and from May 1986 he visited the site several times. At a session of the Politburo in July 1986, he asked to be relieved of the presidency of the academy so that he could correct his mistake. His wife, Marianna, died on 19 June 1986. On 16 October 1986, at his own request, he was released from the post of president. The academy elected Gury Marchuk as his successor in the same month.

In his 1990 interview with Ogonyok, Alexandrov called Chernobyl "a tragedy of my life as well". He blamed the accident on the experiment carried out at the plant and on violations of the operating rules, and said that "it is not a matter of the design". The Washington Post wrote in 1992 that, as the RBMK's principal designer, he had refused to concede that a design flaw contributed to the disaster. After the accident, he devoted most of his time to reactor safety and to dealing with its consequences.

== Death ==
Alexandrov died in Moscow on 3 February 1994. In accordance with his will, he was buried at the Mitinskoe Cemetery in Moscow, beside the graves of the Chernobyl heroes. Several of the firefighters and first responders who died after the disaster are buried at the cemetery.

== Personal life ==
In 1931, Alexandrov married A. M. Zolotaryova, and their son Yuri was born on 26 March 1932. The couple divorced in 1933. In July 1934, he entered a civil marriage with Marianna Alexandrovna Balashova. His other children were Alexander, born in 1937, Pyotr, born in 1943, and Maria, born in 1947. All four of his children became doctors of science.

According to Rossiyskaya Gazeta, Alexandrov avoided privileges, and he refused a Kremlin telephone line at home, joking that his children would immediately start calling Brezhnev.

== Honours and awards ==
Army of Wrangel

Cross of St. George, 2nd class
Cross of St. George, 3rd class
Cross of St. George, 4th class

Soviet Union

Hero of Socialist Labor, thrice (1954, 1960, 1973)
Nine Orders of Lenin (1945, 1949, 1953, 1954, 1956, 1960, 1973, 1978, 1983)
Order of the October Revolution (1967)
Order of the Patriotic War, 1st class (1985)
Order of the Red Banner of Labour (1945)
Medal "For the Defence of Leningrad" (1942)
Medal "For the Defence of Stalingrad" (1942)
Medal "For the Defence of Sevastopol" (1942)
Medal "For Valiant Labour in the Great Patriotic War 1941–1945" (1945)
Medal "For Distinction in Guarding the State Border of the USSR" (1950)
Medal "For the Victory over Germany in the Great Patriotic War 1941–1945" (1945)
Jubilee Medal "Twenty Years of Victory in the Great Patriotic War 1941-1945" (1965)
Jubilee Medal "Thirty Years of Victory in the Great Patriotic War 1941–1945" (1975)
Jubilee Medal "Forty Years of Victory in the Great Patriotic War 1941–1945" (1985)
Jubilee Medal "In Commemoration of the 100th Anniversary of the Birth of Vladimir Ilyich Lenin" (1969)
Medal "Veteran of Labour" (1974)
Jubilee Medal "50 Years of the Armed Forces of the USSR" (1967)
Jubilee Medal "60 Years of the Armed Forces of the USSR" (1978)
Jubilee Medal "70 Years of the Armed Forces of the USSR" (1988)
Medal "In Commemoration of the 800th Anniversary of Moscow" (1947)
Medal "In Commemoration of the 250th Anniversary of Leningrad" (1957)

Foreign

Order of The People's Republic of Bulgaria, 1st class (Bulgaria)
Order of the Flag of the Republic of Hungary (Hungary)
Order of Sukhbaatar (Mongolia)
Order of Merit of the Polish People's Republic, Commander with star (Poland)

Other awards

- Lenin Prize (1959)
- Stalin Prize first degree (1942, 1951, 1953)
- Stalin Prize second degree (1949)
- Diploma of the Presidium of the Supreme Soviet of the Russian Federation (1993)
- Kurchatov Medal (1968)
- Lomonosov Gold Medal (1978)
- Vavilov Gold Medal (1978)
- XXXVIII Mendeleev Reader (4 February 1982)
- The Research Technological Institute in Sosnovy Bor, in Leningrad Oblast, is named after Alexandrov, and a bust and a monument to him stand in the town. His papers from 1932 to 1986 are listed in the American Institute of Physics's international catalogue of sources for the history of physics.

Academic offices
Preceded by Mstislav Keldysh	President of the Academy of Sciences of the USSR; 1975–1986	Succeeded by Gury Marchuk
