= Kapitza Club =

Gathering of Cambridge physicists

The Kapitza Club was a group of physicists who met informally in the 1920s and 1930s in Cambridge, England. The group was founded by Russian physicist Peter Kapitza.

In The Making of the Atomic Bomb, author Richard Rhodes describes the Kapitza Club:

"As Kapitza had settled in at Cambridge he had noticed what he considered to be an excessive and unproductive deference of British physics students to their seniors. He therefore founded a club, the Kapitza Club, devoted to open and unhierarchical discussion. Membership was limited and coveted. Members met in college rooms and Kapitza frequently opened discussions with deliberate howlers so that even the youngest would speak up to correct him, loosening the grip of tradition on their necks."

Graham Farmelo describes the founding of the Kapitza Club in The Strangest Man: The Hidden Life of Paul Dirac, Mystic of the Atom:

"In setting up the Kapitza Club in October 1922, he [Kapitza] had shaken his postgraduate colleagues out of their lethargy and persuaded them to attend a weekly seminar on a topical subject in physics. The talks usually took place in Trinity College on Tuesday evenings, after a good dinner. The speakers, normally volunteers from the club's members, spoke with the aid only of a piece of chalk and a blackboard mounted on an easel and had to be prepared for a series of interruptions, mediated by Kapitza with the quick wit and elan of a modern-day game-show host."

== Notable members and attendees ==
- Harold D. Babcock (1925)
- P. M. S. Blackett (1924)
- Paul Dirac (1925)
- Douglas Hartree (1924)
- Werner Heisenberg (1925)
- Herbert Wakefield Banks Skinner (1924)
- Llewellyn Thomas (1925)
