= Kapitza instability =

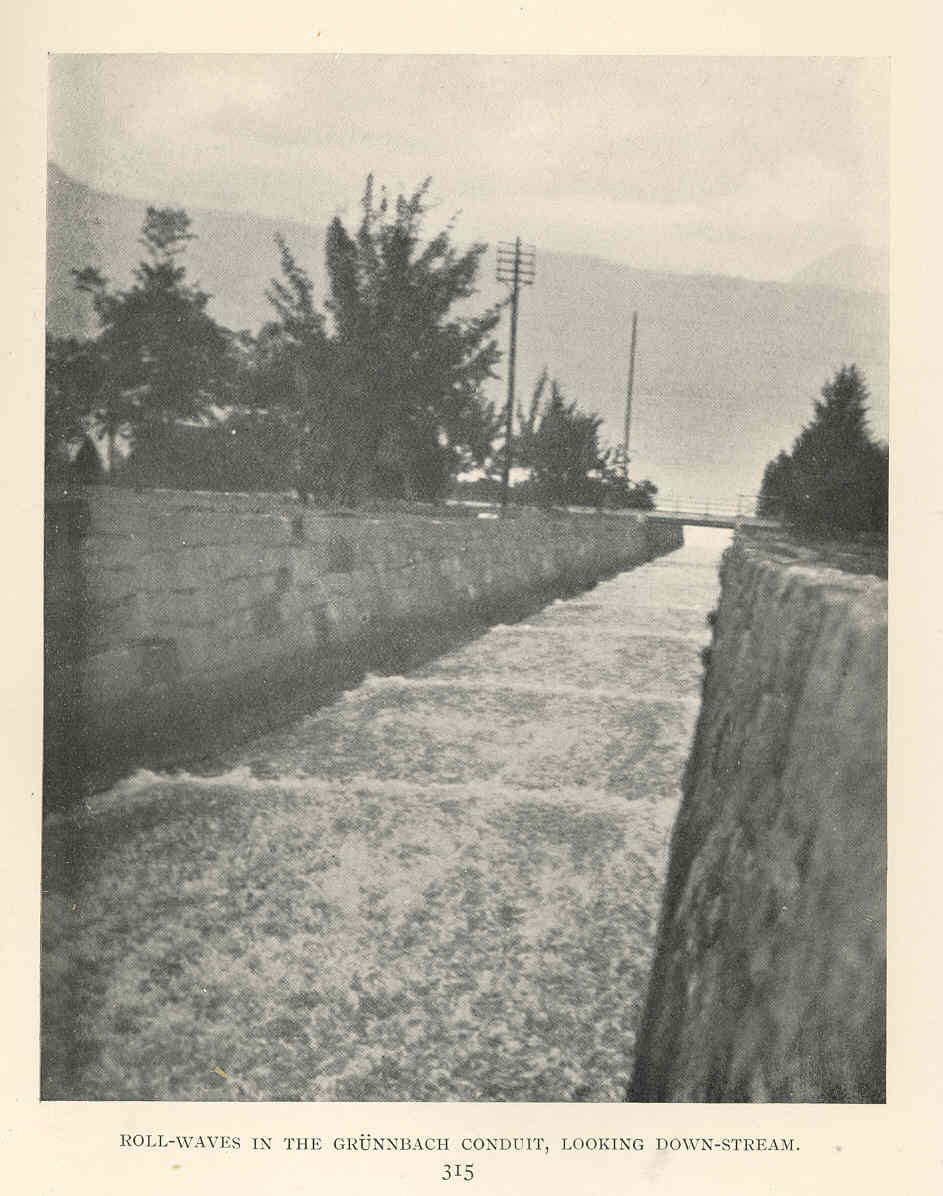
Roll-waves in the Grunnbach Rive, Vaughan Cornish, 1910

In fluid dynamics, the Kapitza instability is an instability that occurs in fluid films flowing down walls. The instability is characterised by the formation of capillary waves on the free surface of the film. The instability is named after Pyotr Kapitsa, who described and analysed the instability in 1948. The free surface waves are known as roll waves.

== Roll waves in granular materials ==
A similar instability has been observed in granular flow, and this instability can be predicted using the Saint-Venant equations with appropriate modifications accounting for the frictional properties of granular flows.
