= Yuri Lazurkin =

Russian physicist

Yuri Semenovich Lazurkin
- Born: 1916; Russian Empire
- Died: August 5, 2009 (aged 92-93)
- Known for: founder of DNA physics
- Scientific career
- Fields: Polymer physics, DNA physics
- Institutions: Leningrad Physico-Technical Institute; I. V. Kurchatov Institute of Atomic Energy; Russian Academy of Sciences
- Doctoral advisor: Anatolii Petrovich Aleksandrov
- Doctoral students: Edward Trifonov

Yuri Semenovich Lazurkin (1916–August 5, 2009) was a Russian physicist and a founder of the new discipline of DNA physics.

== Scientific career ==
Lazurkin started his career in a novel field polymer physics. During World War II, he was in the Navy and worked on demagnetizing of ships.

After the war, he returned to polymer physics. One of the phenomenons that his laboratory studied and greatly contributed to its understanding, was DNA melting.
