= Double scaling limit =

In theoretical physics, a double scaling limit is a limit in which the coupling constant is sent to zero while another quantity is sent to zero or infinity at the same moment.

The adjective "double" is a kind of misnomer because the procedure represents an ordinary scaling. However, the adjective is meant to emphasize that two parameters are simultaneously approaching singular values.

The double scaling limit is often applied to matrix models, string theory, and other theories to obtain their simplified versions.
