= Institute for Physical Problems =

Russian research institute

P. L. Kapitza Institute for Physical Problems
- Институт физических проблем им. П. Л. Капицы РАН
- IPP RAS
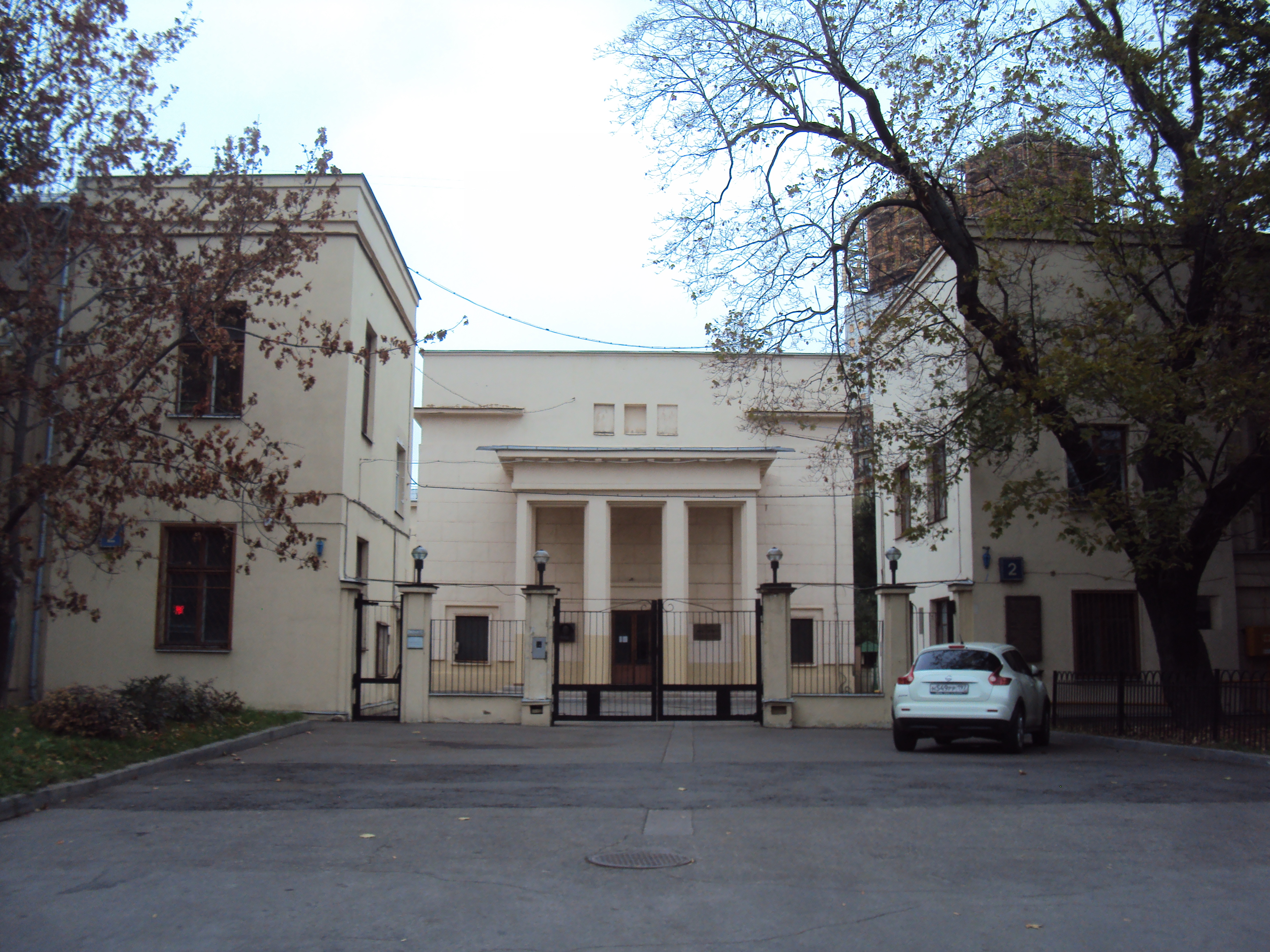
- The Institute of Physical Problems of the USSR Academy of Sciences (historical photo)
- Established: 1934
- Director: Andrey I. Kleev
- Staff: 56
- Location: 2 Kosygina Street, Moscow, 119334, Moscow, Russia
- Postgraduates: 3
- Operating agency: Russian Academy of Sciences
- Nobel laureates: 3
- Website: www.kapitza.ras.ru
- Awarded the (1945)

The P. L. Kapitza Institute for Physical Problems of the Russian Academy of Sciences (IPP RAS) was founded in 1934 as a unique initiative to enable Pyotr L. Kapitza to continue his research in the Soviet Union after his return from England. According to Kapitza, the institution was given the somewhat unconventional name Institute for Physical Problems to emphasize that its focus would not be confined to a single area of knowledge. Instead, it would address "known scientific problems, the scope of which will be determined by the personnel, the scientific staff who will work in it."

Throughout its history, the institute's official name has been changed seven times, reflecting its evolving status and affiliations. This progression is documented on the IPP RAS website:

1. Institute for Physical Problems of the USSR Academy of Sciences (December 23, 1934)
2. Order of the Red Banner of Labour Institute for Physical Problems of the USSR Academy of Sciences (April 30, 1945)
3. Order of the Red Banner of Labour S. I. Vavilov Institute for Physical Problems of the USSR Academy of Sciences (January 25, 1951)
4. Order of the Red Banner of Labour P. L. Kapitza Institute for Physical Problems of the USSR Academy of Sciences (September 11, 1990)
5. P. L. Kapitza Institute for Physical Problems of the Russian Academy of Sciences (November 21, 1991)
6. Institution of the Russian Academy of Sciences "P. L. Kapitza Institute for Physical Problems of the RAS" (December 18, 2007)
7. Federal State Budgetary Institution of Science "P. L. Kapitza Institute for Physical Problems of the RAS" (January 12, 2012)

Compared to other institutes within the Russian Academy of Sciences (RAS), the Institute for Physical Problems is notable for its relatively small size. It began with fewer than ten research scientists and currently employs around fifty (as of the early 21st century). Despite its modest staff numbers, the institute's contributions to global science are immense. Numerous groundbreaking experiments and significant discoveries have been made within its walls, particularly in low-temperature physics and plasma physics (including research related to thermonuclear reactions). Three researchers associated with the institute have been awarded the Nobel Prize in Physics:

- Pyotr L. Kapitza, for his fundamental inventions and discoveries in the area of low-temperature physics, specifically the experimental investigation of superfluidity in helium-II.
- Lev D. Landau, for his pioneering theories for condensed matter, especially liquid helium, which included the theoretical explanation of helium-II's superfluidity.
- Alexei A. Abrikosov, for pioneering contributions to the theory of superconductors and superfluids, specifically the theoretical explanation of the properties of type-II superconductors.

IFP serves as a base institute for the Moscow Institute of Physics and Technology (MIPT). The editorial offices of two prominent physics journals, the Journal of Experimental and Theoretical Physics (JETP) and JETP Letters, are housed on the institute's premises.

From its inception until 1946, the institute's primary research area was low-temperature physics. Key achievements during this period included the discovery of superfluidity in helium-II (through experiments by Pyotr L. Kapitza, with theoretical underpinning provided by Lev D. Landau) and the development of a highly efficient turboexpander for producing liquid oxygen from air, an invention of significant practical value.

In 1945, the institute was decorated with the Order of the Red Banner of Labour.

Between 1946 and 1955, while Pyotr L. Kapitza was effectively under house arrest and removed from the institute's directorship, its research shifted towards atomic physics. Notably, a group led by Lev D. Landau performed crucial numerical calculations for the "Sloika" (layer cake) design concept for the Soviet hydrogen bomb. These calculations gave the USSR an advantage, as similar complex computations were delayed in the United States pending the availability of more powerful computers. During this time, Kapitza continued some work in a small laboratory at his dacha, humorously nicknamed the "izba (hut) of physical problems."

Following Kapitza's reinstatement as director in 1955 and until his death, the institute's main focus returned, this time to plasma physics. A dedicated "Physical Laboratory" building was constructed on the grounds, housing installations designed to generate high-temperature "plasma filaments." These installations were eventually dismantled in 2004 during a major renovation of the institute building.

In 2005, the institute acquired Russia's largest continuous-mode dilution refrigerator.

On July 20, 2023, in response to the Russian invasion of Ukraine, the institute was added to the U.S. Department of State's list of sanctioned entities, specifically targeting organizations supporting Russia's defense sector.

== Institute Directors ==
- Academician Pyotr L. Kapitsa (1934–1946, 1955–1984)
- Academician Anatoly P. Alexandrov (1946–1955)
- Academician Viktor-Andrei Borovik-Romanov (1984–1990)
- Academician Alexander F. Andreev (1990–2017)
- Academician Vladimir V. Dmitriev (2017–2022)
- Dr. Phys.-Math. Sci. Andrey I. Kleev (since 2022)
