= Joel Sussman =

Israeli structural biologist (born 1943)

- יואל זוסמן
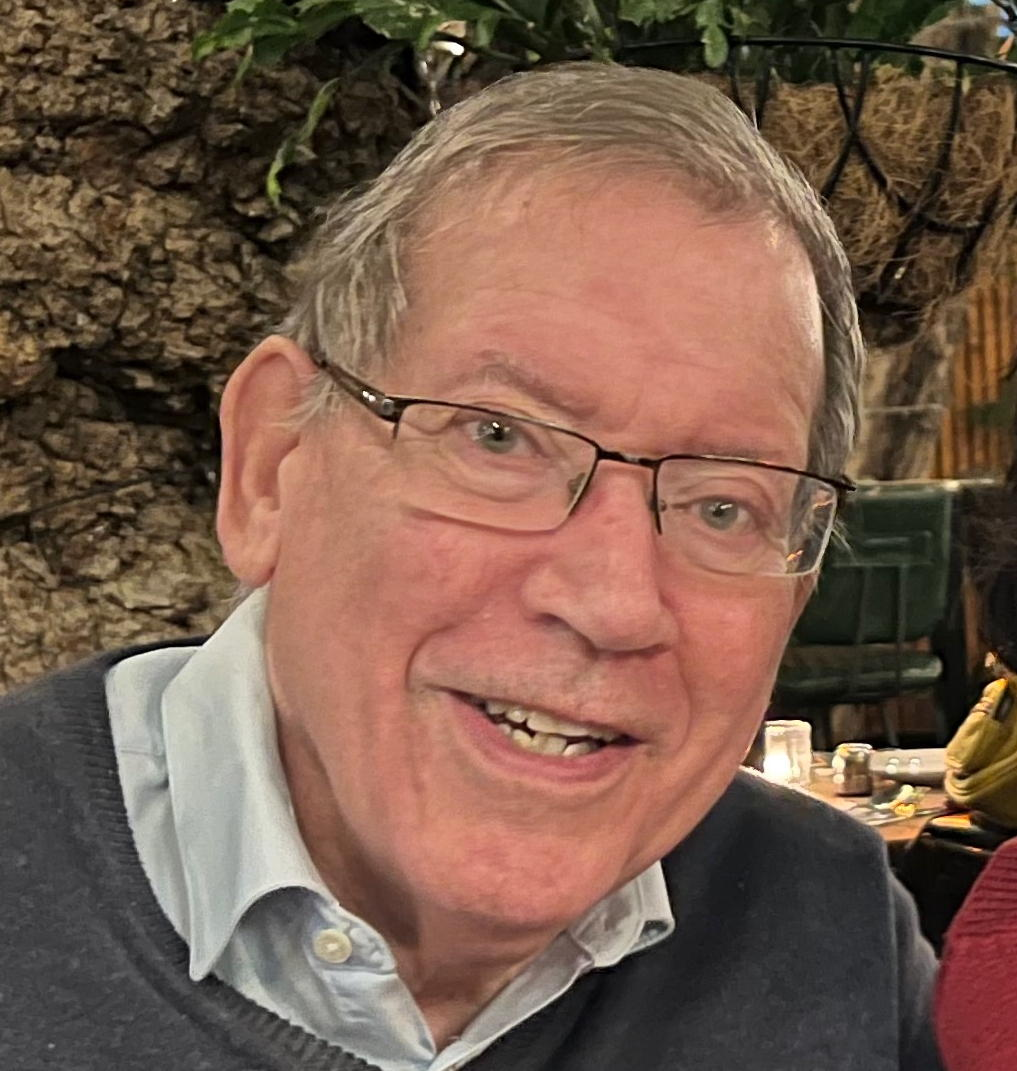
- Born: 24 September 1943 (age 83); Philadelphia, PA
- Education: Cornell University; MIT; Hebrew University; Duke University
- Known for: Studies on acetylcholinesterase
- Awards: Samuel and Paula Elkeles Prize (2005); Teva Founders' Award (2006)
- Scientific career
- Fields: Crystallography; Bioinformatics
- Workplaces: Weizmann Institute of Science
- Doctoral advisor: Cyrus Levinthal
- Website: www.weizmann.ac.il/~joel

Joel L. Sussman (Hebrew: יואל זוסמן; born September 24, 1943) is an Israeli structural biologist best known for his studies on acetylcholinesterase, a key protein involved in transmission of nerve signals. He is Professor Emeritus of Structural Biology at the Weizmann Institute of Science in Rehovot and is Co-Director of the Israel Structural Proteomics Center.

== Early life and education ==
Sussman was born in Philadelphia, Pennsylvania and grew up in Great Neck, L.I., New York, to Ida (née Arbeit), a mathematics professor, and Harry “Pi” Sussman, an electronics engineer. He attended Great Neck North High School, where he participated in an enriched science and computing program established in the United States following the launch of Sputnik 1. As a teenager, he was active in photography and loved reading science fiction books.
He earned a B.A. in mathematics and physics from Cornell University from 1961-65. In the summer of 1962, he spent 10 weeks in the Ivory Coast working and teaching young Ivorian students as part of Operation Crossroads Africa, which later served as a model for the Peace Corps. Prior to departing for Africa, he was invited to the White House as part of a group of in the program, where he met President John F. Kennedy.
He then pursued doctoral studies in biophysics at the Massachusetts Institute of Technology (MIT), completing his Ph.D. in 1972 under Cyrus Levinthal. His doctoral work focused on RNA structure and advances in biological crystallography.

== Academic career ==
Sussman undertook postdoctoral research at the Hebrew University of Jerusalem (1972) with Yehuda Lapidot, and then at Duke University (1973–1976) with Sung-Hou Kim.
In 1976, he immigrated to Israel with his family and joined the Weizmann Institute of Science as a senior scientist in the Department of Structural Chemistry. He was promoted to Associate Professor in 1980 and Full Professor in 1982. After his formal retirement in 2016, he remained active in research as Professor Emeritus.
Sussman has also held visiting positions at several institutions in the United States, including Rutgers University, the National Cancer Institute (NIH), the Laboratory of Molecular Biology at the NIH, the Fox Chase Cancer Center, and the University of California, Berkeley.

== Leadership and service ==
At the Weizmann Institute, Sussman held multiple leadership roles:

- Head, Department of Structural Chemistry (1984–1985)
- Head, Kimmelman Center for Biomolecular Structure and Assembly (1988–1989)
- Incumbent, Morton and Gladys Pickman Chair of Structural Biology (2002–2014)
- Director, Israel Structural Proteomics Center (2002–2014), later Co-Director

From 1994 to 1999, he served as Director of the Protein Data Bank (PDB) at Brookhaven National Laboratory. He has served on numerous scientific committees in Israel and internationally, including as President of the Israel Crystallographic Society.

== Research ==
Sussman’s research spans structural biology, enzymology, and bioinformatics, with over 300 scientific publications.

Macromolecular crystallography
He was a pioneer in methods for refining macromolecular structures, co-developing the CORELS refinement program and applying it to the first high-resolution structures of yeast tRNA^{phe}. He also determined structures of DNA fragments containing bulged nucleotides, providing insight into insertion mutations.

Cholinergic system and acetylcholinesterase
Over more than three decades, Sussman collaborated closely with neurobiologist Israel Silman on cholinergic signaling.
His laboratory determined the first three-dimensional structure of acetylcholinesterase (AChE), using protein purified from the electric organ of Torpedo californica. This work required the development of novel methods to solubilize and crystallize a membrane-associated enzyme.

The structure revealed:
- AChE as a prototype of the α/β hydrolase fold
- A deep active-site gorge governing substrate specificity
- A central role for cation–π interactions in ligand binding

Subsequent. he and his colleagues determined structures of AChE from human and Drosophila, as well as more than 40 complexes with drugs, toxins, and ligands—including many first-generation Alzheimer’s therapeutics, insecticides, and nerve agents. These studies provided a structural framework for structure-based drug design.
In related work, Sussman helped define a family of cholinesterase-like adhesion molecules (CLAMs) and demonstrated functional roles for cholinesterases beyond catalysis. His group also identified structural features, including the proline-rich attachment domain (PRAD), involved in AChE tetramerization.

Intrinsically disordered proteins (IDPs) and bioinformatics
Sussman’s group demonstrated that intracellular domains of the CLAMSs are intrinsically disordered, showing a potential functional role for IPDs; thus showing how IDPs can play a role in control mechanism in vivo.

He co-developed computational tools including:
- FoldIndex, for predicting disordered regions in proteins
- Proteopedia, a collaborative 3D online encyclopedia of biomolecular structures, which has grown into a large international resource, with hundreds of thousands of pages created by contributors worldwide.
- A protein dipole moments server

Radiation damage in crystallography

Sussman and colleagues demonstrated that synchrotron X-ray radiation can induce specific, rapid chemical damage to proteins, including selective disulfide bond cleavage, even at cryogenic temperatures. This work influenced best practices in structural biology data collection and interpretation.

Proteins in extreme environments
He has investigated the molecular basis as to how proteins function under extreme conditions, including two proteins found in bacteria that thrive in the Dead Sea, Halobacterium marismortui, i.e., ferredoxin and Halophilic malate dehydrogenase.
In collaboration with Ada Zamir, Sussman studied proteins functioning under extreme salt conditions. Their work on halotolerant enzymes, including structural determination of carbonic anhydrase from Dunaliella salina, revealed mechanisms enabling protein stability across wide salinity ranges, with implications for biotechnology and enzyme engineering, with unexpected implications for kidney diseases.

Biomedical structural studies
His group determined structures of medically important proteins, including:
- Glucocerebrosidase, implicated in Gaucher disease
- Paraoxonase, associated with protection against atherosclerosis
These studies contributed to understanding disease mechanisms and to therapeutic development.

== Honors and awards ==
- Honorary Doctorates: University of Oulu (2017); Charles University, Prague (2020)
- Honorary Professor, Amity University, India (2016); Chinese Academy of Sciences (2005)
- Ilanit-Katzir Prize for exceptional achievements in the field of Life Sciences (together with Israel Silman) (2014)
- Clarence Broomfield Award for Outstanding Research (2014)
- Fellow, American Association for the Advancement of Science (AAAS) (2013)
- Teva Founders' Award for breakthroughs in molecular medicine (together with Hermona Soreq and Israel Silman) (2005)
- Samuel and Paula Elkeles Prize for Outstanding Scientist in the field of medicine in Israel (together with Israel Silman) (2005)
- Elected member, European Molecular Biology Organization (EMBO) (1994)

== Personal life ==
Sussman met his future wife, Haya, while he was a postdoctoral researcher in Jerusalem. They married in Caesarea, Israel, in 1973. Haya worked as a school psychologist in Nes Ziona and Ashdod. Together they had three children: Ehud, Daphna, and Shai. Haya died in 2010. Sussman has three grandchildren: Maya, Yarin, and Yannai.
Sussman lives on the campus of the Weizmann Institute of Science, where he is Professor Emeritus. He remains actively involved in research, a pursuit he continues to enjoy. Outside of science, he is an avid traveler and enthusiastic photographer.
