= François Hussenot =

François Hussenot (French pronunciation: [fʁɑ̃swa ysno]; 22 March 1912 – 16 May 1951) was a French engineer, credited with the invention of one of the early forms of the flight data recorder.

He attended the École polytechnique from 1930 to 1932. After graduation, he attended two other schools: the Ecole Militaire d'Application de l'Aéronautique in Versailles, where he obtained his pilot license, and the Ecole Supérieure d'Aéronautique (better known as Supaéro), which he graduated in 1935 with a degree in aeronautical engineering.

His career began at the Centre d'Essais de Matériels Aériens (CEMA) of Villacoublay, an aircraft test center, in 1935. In July of that year, he married Yvonne. In 1936, he was sent to Saint-Raphaël, in southern France, to take part in the testing of heavy seaplanes. In 1941, he moved to the Centre d'Essais en Vol de Marignane, where he made his early attempts at constructing a flight data recorder. Unlike modern recorders, Hussenot's early models (hussenographs) had the particularity of storing the information not on a magnetic band, but on an eight meter long by 88 mm wide photographic film, scrolling in front of a thin spot of light deviated by a mirror to represent the data. The initials HB stood for Hussenot and Beaudouin, the name of an early associate who helped Hussenot in developing the device during World War II.

In July 1945, Hussenot was appointed as an engineer at the Brétigny-sur-Orge flight test center (Centre d'Essais en Vol de Brétigny-sur-Orge) as the director of the Methods and Try-Outs service (Service des Méthodes et Essais). In 1946, with Maurice Cambois and Charles Cabaret, he created the Ecole du Personnel Navigant (E.P.N.) school, which later became the EPNER (Ecole du Personnel Navigant d'Essais et de Réception). As of today, the EPNER is one of only six test pilot schools in the world, together with the Empire Test Pilots' School, the United States Air Force Test Pilot School and the United States Naval Test Pilot School, the National Test Pilot School, and the Indian Air Force Test Pilots School.

In 1947 Hussenot founded the SFIM (Société Française des Instruments de Mesure) with his associate Marcel Ramolfo-Garnier, to market his flight data recorder. The SFIM had a successful story of its own, selling many successful data recording devices, before diversifying. The company is today part of the Safran group.

In 1948, Hussenot became professor at SUPAERO. In the same year, he was appointed Chevalier de la Légion d’Honneur, and was awarded the Médaille de l'Aéronautique (Medal of Aeronautics) in recognition for his services.

François Hussenot died in 1951, in a plane crash between Marignane and Mont-de-Marsan.
