= Flight test engineer =

Engineer position in flight testing of aircraft

A flight test engineer (FTE) is an engineer involved in the flight testing of prototype aircraft or aircraft systems.

== Overview ==
The flight test engineer generally has overall responsibility for the planning of a specific flight test phase, which includes preparing the test plans in conjunction with other analytical and/or systems engineers, overseeing the buildup of the aircraft to the proper configuration, working with the flight test instrumentation engineer to ensure the sensors and recording systems are installed for required data parameters, and preparing the maneuver-by-maneuver plan for each test flight (enshrined typically in a higher level document called a "test plan" and then an operational document usually called the "test cards"). The FTE and the experimental test pilot are jointly responsible for the safety of the test flying. The FTE is also responsible for the overall analysis of the data acquired during a test flight. Finally, the flight test engineer will coordinate with specific analysis and/or systems engineers to write the final flight test report, documenting the results of a specific flight test phase.

The FTE may or may not fly on board the test aircraft, depending on the aircraft type or mission objectives. When not in the test aircraft, the FTE normally monitors the test in real-time via data transmitted to a special flight test data center. In this case, the FTE will be in radio contact with the test pilot along with the ground-based team, providing safety of flight monitoring and real-time data analysis.

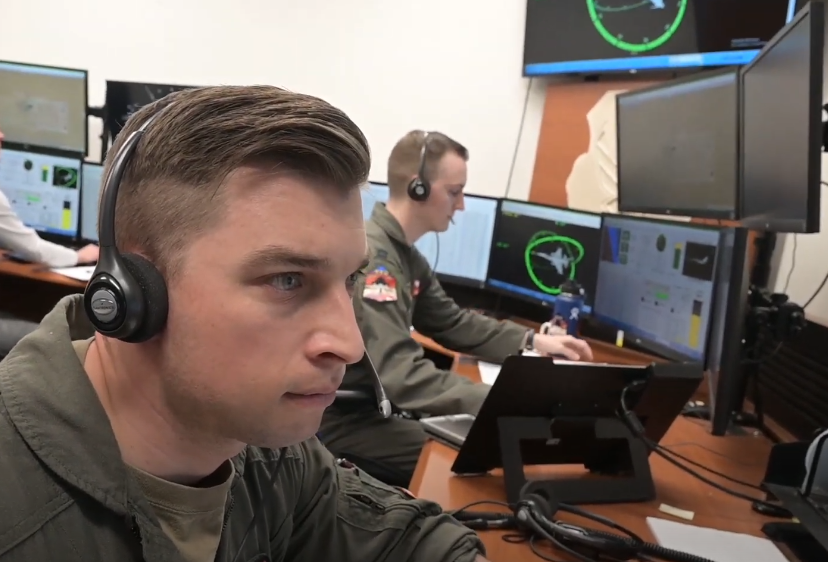
Flight test engineers direct a flight test from a control room

Multiple test aircraft may be required on major aircraft development flight test programs. The test activities of all test aircraft must be coordinated by a senior flight test engineer. On complex test programs, it is also common for each test aircraft to have several FTEs assigned, each with a specific area of responsibility and testing.

Often a flight test engineer will be required to come up with techniques for monitoring a specific variable or system, which requires a bespoke piece of equipment to be fabricated. Owing to the specialized nature of the techniques in manufacturing and electronics involved, a flight test engineer is usually highly skilled and will have undergone in-depth training.

== Education for flight test engineers ==
The flight test engineer may have a degree in a related engineering field such as aerospace engineering, mechanical engineering, or electrical engineering. A bachelor's degree is generally required, and a master's degree is recommended. Many university aerospace engineering departments offer elective flight test courses for those interested in this field of engineering.

The military services have formal training programs for experimental flight test pilots and flight test engineers. These training programs may be attended by selected military or government-employed civilian pilots and engineers. Most military test pilot schools combine pilot and engineers in one class, where they work together just as they would in the real world.

Flight Test Schools:

- United States Air Force Test Pilot School - USAF TPS
- United States Naval Test Pilot School - USN TPS
- National Test Pilot School, located in Mojave, California, USA - NTPS
- Empire Test Pilot School (Great Britain) - ETPS
- École du personnel navigant déssais et de réception (France) École du personnel navigant d'essais et de réception - EPNER
- Escuela Española de Ensayos en Vuelo y Aeronavegabilidad (E4A) (Madrid, Spain) - E4A
- Instituto de Pesquisa e Ensaios em Voo (IPEV) (Brazil) - CEV
- Indian Air Force Test Pilot school (Bangalore, India), the only school in Asia which trains Flight Test Engineers.
- Fedotov Test Pilot School, Russian aviation industry TPS located in the Gromov Flight Research Institute, Zhukovsky, Russia
- Test Flying Academy of South Africa - (South Africa) - TFASA
- International Test Pilots School, located in London, Ontario, Canada - ITPS

A number of Flight Test Schools offer degrees in flight test engineering:

- As of 2008, all graduates of the United States Air Force Test Pilot School receive an accredited master's degree in flight test engineering from the U.S. Air Force Air University.
- The University of Tennessee Space Institute in Tullahoma, TN and Florida Institute of Technology offer MS degrees in flight test engineering via traditional and distance education and offer short courses in flight test subjects.
- The Institut Supérieur de l'Aéronautique et de l'Espace (ISAE-SUPAERO) in Toulouse France offers full-time MS degree in Flight Test Engineering. This an elite program of SUPAERO and the FTE graduates get to work on variety of flight test programs at Airbus, Dassault, Safran, Thales, ESA etc.
- The National Test Pilot School offers Master of Science degrees in Flight Test Engineering (MSFTE) and Flight Test and Evaluation (MSFT&E). Upon successful completion of the course of study, students who have an undergraduate degree from an ABET or equivalent university program are eligible to receive the MSFTE degree. Students with other technical backgrounds will be awarded the MSFT&E degree.
- The International Test Pilots School offers two accredited Master of Science degrees: Master of Science in Flight Test Engineering and Master of Science in Flight Testing. Candidates must have a qualifying undergraduate degree and successfully complete mandatory and elective credits and final project for the one year program. Students may qualify for a Post-Graduate Work Permit upon graduation.

While not required, many FTEs are also civilian or military rated pilots. Although FTEs do not actively control the aircraft during tests, this flight background is valuable in understanding flight operations.

== See also ==
- Aerospace engineering
- Flight test instrumentation
