= Palamadai Muthuswamy Ramachandran =

Indian Air Force officer (1935–2021)

Palamadai Muthuswamy Ramachandran PVSM, AVSM, SC, VM
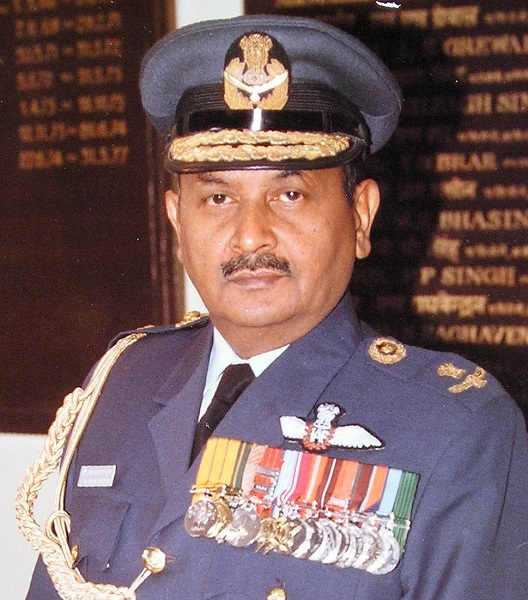
- Born: 24 February 1935
- Died: 6 May 2021 (aged 86)
- Military career
- Allegiance: India
- Branch: Indian Air Force
- Service years: 8 Oct 1955 – 28 February 1993
- Rank: Air Marshal
- Service number: 4973
- Commands: 28 Sqn, IAF Aircraft & Systems Testing Establishment Air Force Station, Ambala
- Conflicts: Liberation of Goa
- Awards: Param Vishisht Seva Medal; Ati Vishisht Seva Medal; Shaurya Chakra; Vayusena Medal

Palamadai Muthuswamy Ramachandran, PVSM, AVSM, SC, VM (24 February 1935 – 6 May 2021) was an Indian Air Force officer.

Ramachandran was commissioned as a pilot into the fighter stream of the Indian Air Force in 1955. He participated in the Liberation of Goa in 1961 where he destroyed the Portuguese patrol boat NRP Vega, for which he was awarded a Shaurya Chakra.

Ramachandran qualified as an experimental test pilot at the Empire Test Pilots' School in the UK, where he was awarded the Edward's Award for best all-around progress in the course. He then did extensive test flying at various Indian Air Force and HAL establishments, including on the Jaguar, MiG-21, MiG-23 and MiG-25 aircraft. In 1979, Ramachandran became the first pilot from outside the Soviet bloc to be permitted to fly the MiG-25 Foxbat.

Ramachandran's command and staff appointments during his career include: commanding officer, 28 Sqn, IAF; set up and first commanding officer of the IAF Experimental Test Pilot's School; commandant, Aircraft & Systems Testing Establishment; Air officer commanding, Air Force Station, Ambala and vice chief of air staff. As Vice Chief, Ramachandran was responsible for the operational deployment of India's short-range ballistic missile, Prithvi.

Ramachandran was a graduate of the Defence Services Staff College and National Defence College, a Fellow of the Royal Aeronautical Society and a member of the Aeronautical Society of India.

== Military awards and decorations ==
Ramachandran was awarded the PVSM, AVSM, SC and VM in his career with the Indian Air Force that lasted almost four decades.

=== Param Vishisht Seva Medal citation ===
CITATION
AIR MARSHAL PALAMADAI MUTHUSWAMY RAMACHANDRAN

Air Marshal Palamadai Muthuswamy Ramachandran, was commissioned in the IAF on the 8th October, 1955. During his long and distinguished career, he has held a large number of key command and staff appointments which included the command of a frontline fighter Squadron, Director of Personnel (Officers) at Air HQ and Senior Air Staff Officer of an operational command.

Applying his excellent professional expertise to real problems, the Air Officer has been displaying rare dynamism and courage throughout his career. During the Goa Operations in 1961, he carried out a bold attack and destroyed enemy patrol boats carrying explosives. He was awarded Shaurya Chakra for gallantry.

An alumnus of the prestigious National Defence College, the Air Officer made a distinguished contribution to the concepts of inter-service planning when posted to Defence Planning Staff in the rank of Air Vice Marshal in 1983. Later, as Director of Personnel (Officers) at Air HQ, the Air Officer introduced innovative promotion schemes such as personal ranks of Gp Capt which came at a time when the service was beset with serious promotional bottlenecks.

On being appointed Senior Air Staff Officer of South Western Air Command in 1990 in the rank of Air Marshal, the Air Officer provided the much needed foresight, conceptual framework and administrative dynamism for a large number of operational exercises conducted in his Command. In his last appointment of Vice Chief of Air Staff, the Air Officer used his vast professional expertise, operational experience and ability for finding out solutions to complex problems.

Air Marshal Palamadai Muthuswamy Ramachandran, AVSM, SC, VM, has, thus, rendered distinguished service of the most exceptional order.

=== Ati Vishisht Seva Medal citation ===
CITATION
GROUP CAPTAIN PALAMADAI MUTHUSWAMY RAMACHANDRAN

Group Captain Palamadai Muthuswamy Ramachandran (4973) Flying (Pilot), has been on the posted strength of Aircraft and System Testing Establishment since February, 1976. He was commissioned in the Air Force in October, 1955. His entire service has been marked with outstanding professional competence in every field of activity that he served. Whether as a test pilot, a fighter squadron commander, a pilot attack instructor or as a staff officer, his performance has always been of an extremely high order. His devotion to duty, his courage, and his dedication to the service have already won him recognition in the form of awards of the Shaurya Chakra during the Goa Operations, 1961 and Vayu Sena Medal after three years in command of a fighter squadron from 1973 to 1976.

Group Captain Ramachandran qualified as a test pilot in the Empire Test Pilot's School in the UK in 1962. Since then, he has been closely involved with a wide variety of activities affecting the evaluation and induction of new aircraft, weapons and airborne equipment for the Air Force. He has served Hindustan Aircraft Limited on deputation as Chief Test Pilot in the Kanpur Division and has actively participated in the evaluation of several transport, trainer and fighter aircraft for the Air Force. In 1976, as a Wing Commander he took charge of the Test Pilot's School at ASTE and was responsible for the conduct of the first Experimental Test Pilot's Course to be run in this country. India is one of the few countries in the world to provide this very highly specialised form of training, and much of the credit for the success of the venture, goes to the high quality of supervision and leadership exercised by Group Captain Ramachandran. In June, 1977, he took over as the Chief Test Pilot of ASTE. Since then he has been responsible for the planning, supervision and conduct of a vast number of evaluation, development and flight trials, not only for the Air Force, but also for the Research and Development Agencies and the Space Department. He has himself been an active participant in a majority of these trials which have won high praise and recognition for ASTE both within our country and in advanced aeronautical nations with whom India maintains friendly contacts. In the course of his career, Group Captain Ramachandran has flown over 3800 hours on 50 types of aircraft. Of this, over 1500 hours have been spent in testing of almost every type of fixed wing aircraft operated by the Air Force. At all times he met the exacting demands and challenges of this type of work with extreme dedication in the interests of the nation and the service.

Group Captain Palamadai Muthuswamy Ramachandran has thus rendered distinguished service of an exceptional order.

=== Shaurya Chakra citation ===
Air Marshal Ramachandran was awarded the Shaurya Chakra for operations during the Liberation of Goa. The citation reads as follows:

CITATION
FLIGHT LIEUTENANT PALAMADAI MUTHUSWAMY RAMACHANDRAN

On 18th December, 1961, Flight Lieutenant Ramachandran was detailed to lead a section of two Vampires in close support of the ground forces in Diu. While flying over the area, he noticed a patrol boat heading towards an IN Ship which was about two miles from the shore. On his own initiative he decided to fly low to survey the patrol boat, when the boat as well as Diu fort opened heavy fire at his aircraft. Undeterred by the hostile fire, he attacked and blew up the patrol boat which was full of high explosives. During the attack his aircraft was damaged by hostile fire.

Flight lieutenant Ramachandran displayed courage and initiative of a high order.

=== Vayu Sena Medal citation ===
CITATION
WING COMMANDER PALAMADAI MUTHUSWAMY RAMACHANDRAN

Wing Commander Palamadai Muthuswamy Ramachandran has been in Command of an operational Squadron, since September, 1973 whose task is to convert pilots to the latest supersonic fighter aircraft. The squadron has functioned very well and has regularly completed its flying tasks. Wing Commander Ramachandran has a distinguished flying career right from the time he joined the Air Force. He secured the Nabha Trophy for standing first in Ground Subjects in the Air Force Academy and Hindustan Aeronautcs Limited Trophy for standing first in flying training at Hakimpet. He topped the class in pilot attack instructor's course in 1959. At the test pilots course in Farnborough, he was awarded the Edward's trophy for showing the best all round progress in the course. He has flown 47 types of aircraft, total flying being approximately 3050 hours. In Hindustan Aeronautics Limited, he was responsible for training Indian Air Lines pilots of HS-748 aircraft and thereafter he was associated with IAC field trials on HS-748. He also carried out proving and inaugural flights of the IAC to Visakhapatnam and Colombo. Wing Commander Palamadai Muthuswamy Ramachandran has throughout displayed courage, professional skill and devotion to duly of a high order.

Param Vishisht Seva Medal		Ati Vishisht Seva Medal	
Shaurya Chakra	Vayusena Medal	General Service Medal 1947	Samar Seva Star
Paschimi Star	Raksha Medal	Sangram Medal	Sainya Seva Medal
25th Anniversary Independence medal	30 Years Long Service Medal	20 Years Long Service Medal	9 Years Long Service Medal

Military offices
Preceded by Nirmal Chandra Suri	Vice Chief of the Air Staff; 1991–1993	Succeeded by Pondicherry Jayarao Jayakumar
Preceded by Brijesh Dhar Jayal	Air Officer Commanding, Air Force Station, Ambala; 1985-1987	Succeeded by Dinanath R Nadkarni
Preceded by Pirthi Singh	Commandant, Aircraft & Systems Testing Establishment; 1982–1984	Succeeded by Partha Kumar Dey
Preceded by BK Bishnoi	Commanding officer, No. 28 Squadron IAF; 1973–1976	Succeeded by Janak Kumar
