= International Test Pilots School =

Commercial test pilot training institute in London, Ontario, Canada

Coordinates: 43.03099°N 81.15552°W

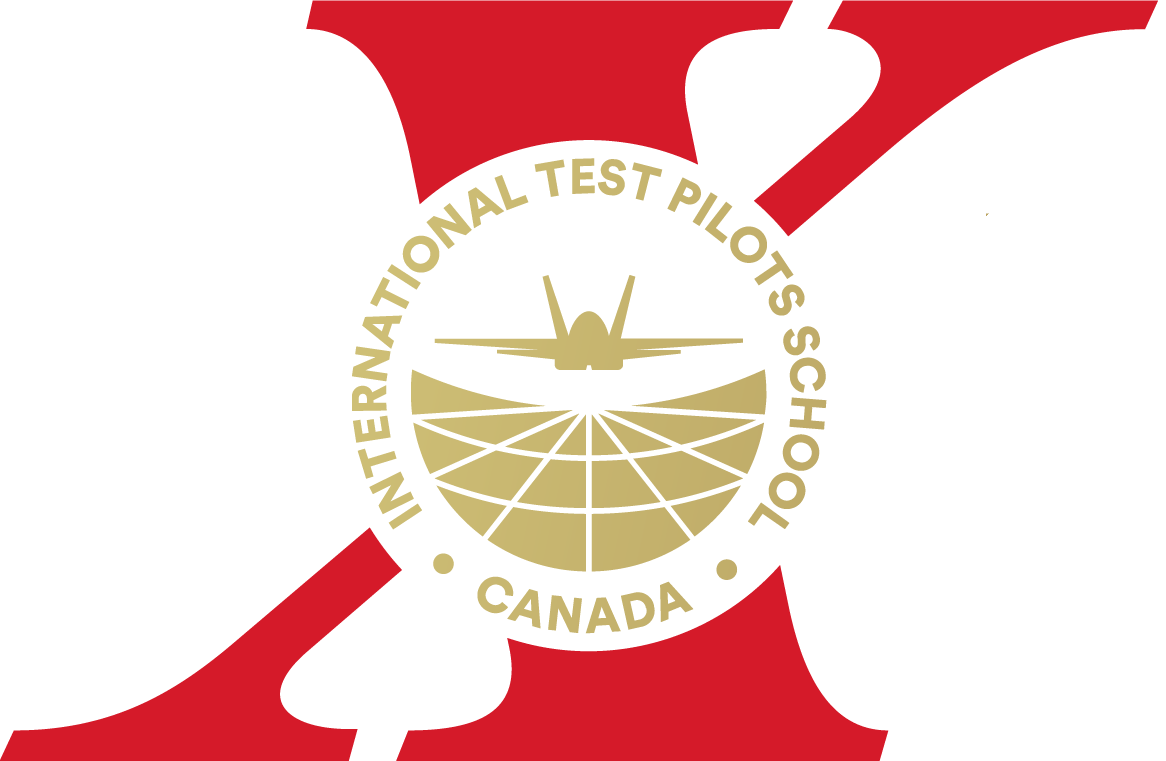
- Type: Test pilot school
- Industry: Aerospace
- Founded: 1986; 40 years ago
- Headquarters: London, Ontario, Canada
- Area served: Global
- Services: Test pilot and flight test engineer training
- Website: https://www.itpscanada.com

The International Test Pilots School Canada (ITPS Canada) located in London, Ontario, is one of the eight test pilot schools recognized globally by the international Society of Experimental Test Pilots and the Society of Flight Test Engineers. The school trains test pilots and flight test engineers. It is the first civilian test pilot school in Canada. ITPS Canada is registered as an Authorized Training Organization by the European Aviation Safety Agency. It shares some facilities with and neighbours the Jet Aircraft Museum at London International Airport.

== History ==
ITPS first offered flight test training in 1986, when established by a previous senior staff member of the Empire Test Pilots School in the United Kingdom. The school was first located in Cranfield in England, working alongside the prestigious College of Aeronautics at Cranfield University.

In 2001, the school moved its operations to the Aerospace Engineering Test Establishment located at CFB Cold Lake before moving to its current location at London International Airport, Ontario in 2005. The school was recognized by the Society of Experimental Test Pilots in 2017 and by the Society of Flight Test Engineers in 2018. In 2022, ITPS Canada hosted the international 10th Annual Flight Test Seminar. Operations include a 10,000 square foot modern offices and classrooms and a 27,000 square foot hangar.

== Training ==
The curriculum includes both long and short courses focusing on flight tests. Flight test graduate, diploma and certificate courses are offered, the former typically for military students. Test planning, test flying, data analysis and report writing are all part of the training. Students from around the world are trained using various military fighters, training jets, light airplanes, helicopters and flight simulators. One of Australia's first RAAF female pilots, Robyn Clay-Williams, trained at ITPS.

== Staff ==
ITPS Canada has staff members from multiple countries including academics, military veterans, maintenance personnel and test pilot graduates (test pilots and flight test engineers). Notable staff over the years included retired Canadian Space Agency astronaut Bjarni Tryggvason (deceased, 2022) who once flew as a Payload Specialist on Space Shuttle Discovery.

== Aircraft ==
As of November 2023, ITPS Canada has the following aircraft registered with Transport Canada and the FAA and operate as Nav Canada airline designator SA, and telephony STALLION.

Aircraft
	Number	Origin
Rotary wing
Airbus Helicopters AS355	1	France
Bell 206	1	Canada
MBB Bo 105	1	Germany
Sikorsky S-76	1	United States
Fixed wing
Aero L-29 Delfín	3	Czech Republic
Aero L-39 Albatros	8	Czech Republic
Beechcraft 60 Duke	1	United States
Brasov IAR 823	1	Romania
Cessna 414	1	United States
Cirrus SR22	1	United States
Grumman HU-16	1	United States
Hawker Hunter T.7	3	United Kingdom
Rutan Long-EZ	2	United States
Sukhoi Su-29	1	Russia

Future Acquisitions
	Number	Origin	Notes
Aermacchi M-346T-20 Master	~6-12	Italy	

== See also ==
- List of test pilot schools
