= Brijesh Dhar Jayal =

Indian air marshal

Air Marshal Brijesh Dhar Jayal AVSM, PVSM, VM and Bar
- Born: 27 September 1935 (age 91)
- Military career
- Allegiance: India
- Branch: Indian Air Force
- Rank: Air Marshal
- Awards: Ati Vishisht Seva Medal, Param Vishisht Seva Medal

Air Marshal Brijesh Dhar Jayal PVSM AVSM VM and Bar is a retired officer of the Indian Air Force, who served in the appointment of Air Officer Commanding-in-Chief of the South Western Air Command from 1992 to 1993. He was awarded the Param Vishisht Seva Medal and Ati Vishisht Seva Medal. Jayal went to The Doon School, passing out in 1953. He was later trained as a test pilot at the Empire Test Pilots' School, UK.

He was commissioned into the Air Force on October 8, 1955. He retired in 1993.
