= École du personnel navigant d'essais et de réception =

Coordinates: 43.5229°N 4.9235°E

EPNER (École du Personnel Navigant d’Essais et de Réception) is the French test pilot school, based on the Istres-Le Tubé Air Base, France. One of the five main test pilot schools in the western hemisphere, EPNER maintains close links with the three schools; the Empire Test Pilots' School (ETPS); the United States Air Force Test Pilot School (USAFTPS) and the United States Naval Test Pilot School (USNTPS).

== History ==
EPNER was established in 1946 (79 years ago) at the French flight test centre in Brétigny-sur-Orge, to train specialist crews involved in test flying. They underwent theoretical and practical training to allow flight testing of aircraft to be conducted in the safest possible conditions.

Based on Istres since 1962, EPNER is a division of the CEV reporting directly to the Direction des Centres d’expertise et d’Essais (DCE) under the control of the procurement agency of the French Ministry of Defense, the DGA (Direction générale de l'armement). This gives the school a unique position between the armed forces and industry on the one hand and between the activities of testing military and civilian sectors on the other.

== Training ==
EPNER provides training for test pilots, flight test engineers, flight engineers and technicians involved in flight testing and airtraffic controllers involved in control of flight tests.

Aircrew training include Class A (Experimental and Acceptance Testing) or the shorter Class B (Acceptance Testing) courses on either fixed or rotary-wing aircraft. A light aircraft test pilot course is also offered.

== Aircraft ==
Fixed wing aircrew can expect to fly Mirage 2000, Alphajet, CASA 235 (twin turboprop), Falcon 20, PC 7, Gliders, Airbus A320, CL415 Water Bomber, and numerous other types. Rotary wing aircrew will fly Eurocopter AS365 Dauphin, Squirrel, Puma, Super Puma, Gazelle, Robinson R44, Bell 205, BO 105, Lynx and other types.

== See also ==
- François Hussenot, one of the founders of the school.
- List of test pilot schools
