= List of test pilot schools =

There are several test pilot schools around the world, formed after the example of the original Empire Test Pilots' School in the UK with mission to train already experienced pilots and engineers to test new and experimental aircraft (listed below by years of foundation):

== Government-sponsored schools ==
- Empire Test Pilots' School, British school based at Boscombe Down, England (founded 1943)
- U.S. Air Force Test Pilot School, Edwards Air Force Base, California (founded 1944)
- United States Naval Test Pilot School, Naval Air Station Patuxent River, Maryland (founded 1945)
- École du Personnel Navigant d'Essais et de Réception (EPNER), Istres, France (founded 1946)
- Fedotov Test Pilot School, Russian aviation industry school based at the Gromov Flight Research Institute, Zhukovsky (founded 1947)
- Indian Air Force Test Pilot School, Bangalore, India (founded 1973)
- Soviet and Russian Air Force Test Pilots Training Centre — division of the Chkalov 929th State Flight Test Centre of the Russian Ministry of Defence, Akhtubinsk, Russia (founded 1973)
- Divisão de Formação em Ensaios em Voo (EFEV — Brazilian Air force Test Pilot school), São José dos Campos, Brazil (founded 1986)

== Privately funded schools ==
- National Test Pilot School, Mojave, California (founded 1981)
- International Test Pilots School, London International Airport, London, Ontario (founded 1986 in Cranfield, UK)
- Test Flying Academy of South Africa, Oudtshoorn (founded 1998 as National Test Pilot School of South Africa - NTPS SA)

== University-associated schools ==
- Linköping University Flight Test School, Linköping, Sweden
- Escuela Española de Ensayos en Vuelo y Aeronavegabilidad (E4A), Madrid, Spain (founded 2016, as the Technical University of Madrid school)

== See also ==
- List of aerospace flight test centres
