= Robyn Clay-Williams =

Australian military pilot and academic

- Born: Robyn Williams; Sydney, Australia
- Military career
- Service: Royal Australian Air Force
- Service years: 1979–2003
- Rank: Wing Commander
- Commands: No. 85 Wing
- Other work: Academic

Robyn Clay-Williams is an Australian academic and one of the first two women to serve as pilots in the Royal Australian Air Force (RAAF). She joined the RAAF in 1979 and initially served in maintenance roles as women were not permitted to be pilots. After this restriction was lifted she completed pilot training in June 1988 and became a test pilot in 1993. Clay-Williams reached the rank of Wing Commander and led No. 85 Wing. After leaving the RAAF in 2003, she completed a doctorate. As of 2024, Clay-Williams was a professor at Macquarie University.

== Career ==
=== Military service ===
Robyn Clay-Williams (originally Robyn Williams) was raised in Sydney. She developed a strong interest in becoming a pilot from the age of 10. She was inspired by Deborah Lawrie initiating a sex discrimination case against Ansett Australia in the late 1970s when her application to become an airline pilot was rejected. Lawrie went on to win the case and became the first female pilot with a major Australian airline in 1980.

On completing school, Williams sought an RAAF pilot traineeship. She was rejected as the air force did not permit women to serve as pilots at the time. Nevertheless, she enlisted in the RAAF during 1979 with the goal of undertaking training in electrical engineering to prepare to serve as a military pilot in the future. Williams was trained a radio engineer at the Engineer Cadet Squadron, and graduated in 1982. Women were not allowed to carry weapons during Australian military parades at the time, and the male members of her radio engineer course decided to attend their graduation parade without ceremonial swords in solidarity with Williams. She and another airwoman who had graduated from the course in 1981 submitted Redresses of Grievance to protest this discrimination, which they argued harmed the status of female officers. Their complaints were rejected, and the regulations were not changed until the 1990s. Williams served in a unit which maintained C-130 Hercules and Boeing 707 aircraft, and was later a divisional officer at the Australian Defence Force Academy.

Following a change in policy, the RAAF advertised for female applicants who were interested in undertaking pilot training in October 1986. Williams, who was a Flight Lieutenant at the time, was one of the first four women to be selected. She and Officer Cadet Deborah Hicks became the first women to qualify as pilots when they completed their pilots course on 30 June 1988. Williams achieved the highest marks of any of the course's participants, and received the De Havilland Australia Trophy for being the dux of the course. While Williams was hopeful of a posting to a combat unit flying fighter jets in recognition of topping the course, women were not permitted to serve in such units at the time. She and Hicks were offered only non-combat roles. Williams chose a posting to the School of Air Navigation.

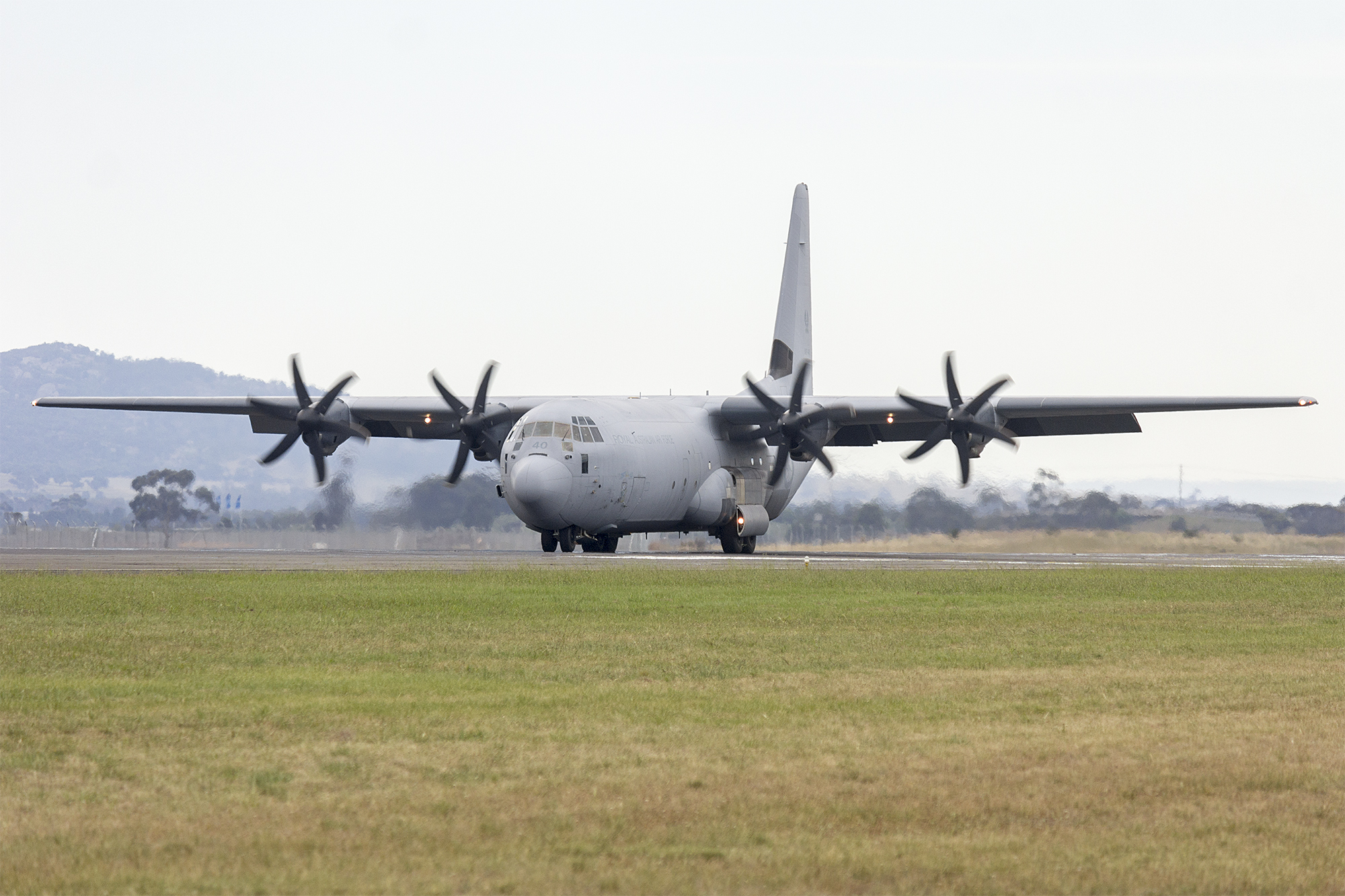
The RAAF's first C-130J Hercules in 2015; Clay-Williams was the pilot for this aircraft's initial flight in February 1997

From January to December 1993 Flight Lieutenant Williams undertook training at the International Test Pilots School in the United Kingdom. She was a dux of the course. Upon graduation Williams became the RAAF's first female test pilot, and served with the Aircraft Research and Development Unit. She reviewed large quantities of technical documentation as part of the RAAF's acquisition of twelve Lockheed Martin C-130J Super Hercules aircraft. Her familiarity with the type led to a posting to the United States in 1995 where she was the resident project test pilot for the process of accepting the aircraft into RAAF service. The posting was originally scheduled to be for one year, but turned out to be for five years due to problems with the aircraft's design and the need to test modifications. As part of the testing process Williams found that the C-130J's head-up display had been installed at a height which made the aircraft unsuitable for the majority of female military pilots, including herself. Rectifying this problem required changes to the aircraft's cockpit and control systems which she was involved in testing. She met her husband David Clay in the United States, and was seven months pregnant when she signed the documentation to accept the RAAF's final C-130J.

Clay-Williams returned to Australia in 2000, and was promoted to the rank of Wing Commander shortly afterwards. She remained a member of the C-130J Project Office until becoming the commanding officer of No. 85 Wing. She left the RAAF during 2003. Historian Alan Stephens has written that Clay-Williams "enjoyed a brilliant career" with the RAAF.

In 2021 Clay-Williams was one of 10 RAAF personnel whose experiences were highlighted as part of the celebrations of the Air Force's centenary.

=== Academic career ===
After leaving the RAAF, Clay-Williams completed a doctorate which involved developing a crew resource management-based approach to training in the healthcare sector. As of 2021, she was an associate professor at Macquarie University's Centre for Healthcare Resilience and Implementation Science and had completed more than 80 peer-reviewed outputs. She was promoted to professor in January 2024.

Clay-Williams' academic areas of interest include "teams and teamwork, decision-making, leadership, simulation, resilience engineering, and usability test and evaluation of medical devices and IT systems".
