= Indian Air Force Test Pilot School =

Pilot School (Military Unit)

- Active: April 1957 – present
- Country: India
- Branch: Indian Air Force
- Type: test pilot school
- Role: Training of test pilots and flight test engineers
- Part of: Aircraft & Systems Testing Establishment (ASTE)
- Garrison/HQ: Hindustan Aeronautics Limited Bangalore
- Nickname: (AFTPS) Air Force Test Pilots School
- Motto: Sukshamata Evam Utkarsh
- Decorations: Award of Presidential Standard

The Indian Air Force Test Pilot School is a unit of the Indian Air Force (IAF) that evaluates aircraft and systems for induction into user organisations. Most new aircraft types and major airborne systems must have ASTE's stamp of approval to be considered fit for service in India. While many countries have testing facilities of one kind or the other, training of flight test personnel is not often imparted in them. ASTE's Air Force Test Pilots School (AFTPS) is only the fifth such institution in the world.

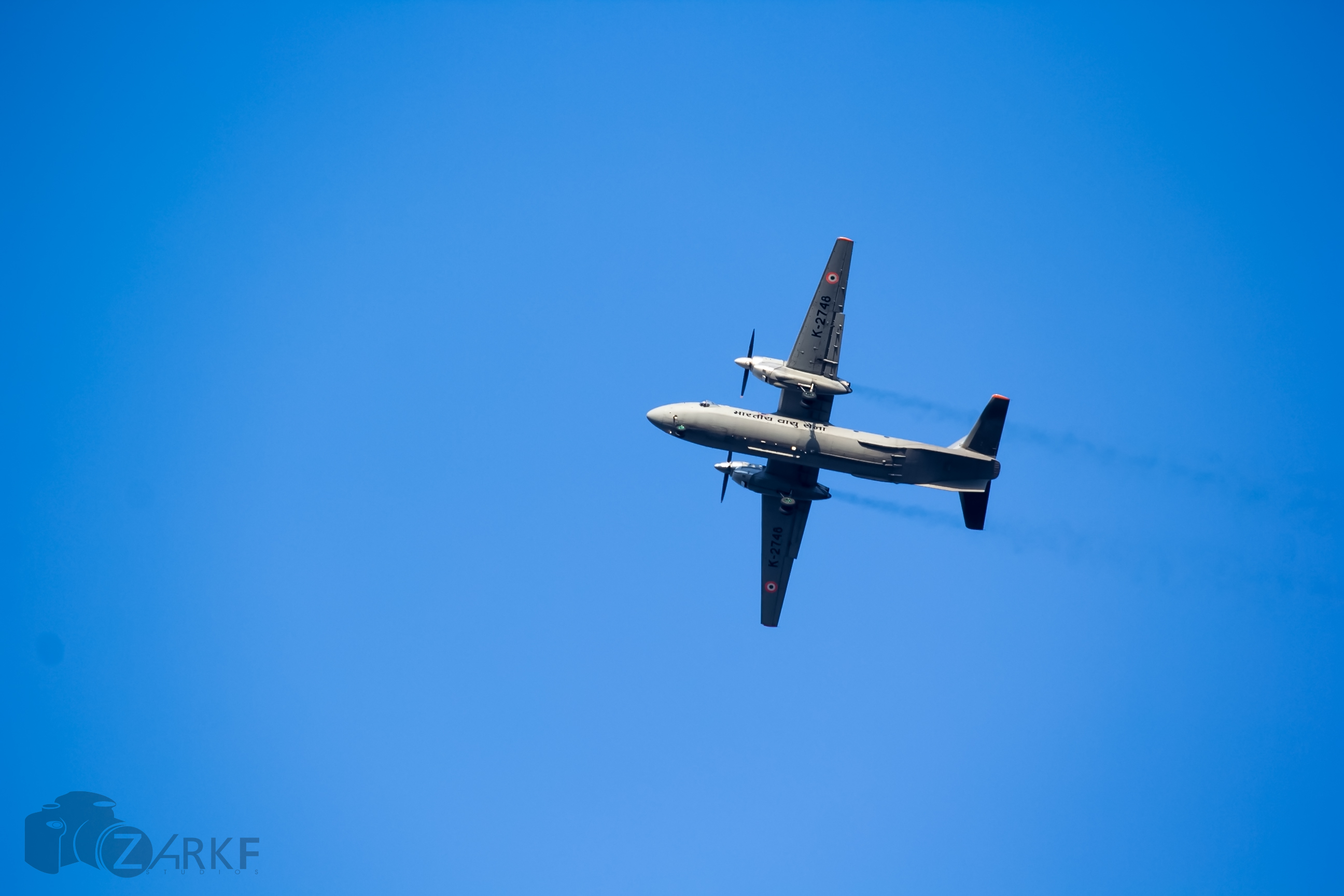
Indian Air Force's upgraded An-32 being tested.

== History ==
Since India's independence, the IAF has been actively involved in defending territorial boundaries. In 1948, the IAF acquired its first jet fighter type, the de Havilland Vampire, and the Aircraft Testing Unit (ATU) was raised under the command of Wg Cdr H Moolgavkar to accept and test these aircraft. By the early 1950s, IAF felt the need to expand its aircraft holdings. The ageing fleet of Vampires, Toofanis and Mysteres were required to be upgraded and eventually replaced, to meet fresh challenges. Indian aviation industry, in the form of Hindustan Aeronautics Limited (HAL), was already being provided highly skilled pilots by IAF for flight test duties. Anticipating the need for an indigenous flight-testing capability, and to launch flight testing in India on a formal footing, IAF sent two pilots to the Empire Test Pilots' School in October 1949. These pilots were followed by several others in succeeding years and they formed the core group in the establishment of the Aircraft and Armament Testing Unit (A&ATU) Kanpur, a precursor to ASTE.

On 9 December 1970, keeping pace with its expanding field of activity, the Commanding Officer's post at A&ATU was further upgraded to Group Captain, and Group Captain Kapil Bhargava VM was appointed to fill this prestigious slot. The next two years saw an increase in avionics systems trials like IFF, V/UHF sets, gun sights, FR cameras etc., in addition to armament and airframe testing. The unit's role was growing and on 23 August 1972, A&ATU was reorganised as Aircraft and Systems Testing Establishment (ASTE).

In 1984, two officers of ASTE, Wg Cdr Ravish Malhotra and Sqn Ldr Rakesh Sharma achieved celebrity status, when they were selected to undergo training for the Indo-Soviet joint space venture. On 3 Apr 1984, Sqn Ldr Rakesh Sharma was launched into space in a SOYUZ T −11 along with his Soviet counterparts.

His Excellency Dr A. P. J. Abdul Kalam, the President of India, presented the 'Presidential Standard' to ASTE on 21 Nov 2005.

== Flight evaluations ==
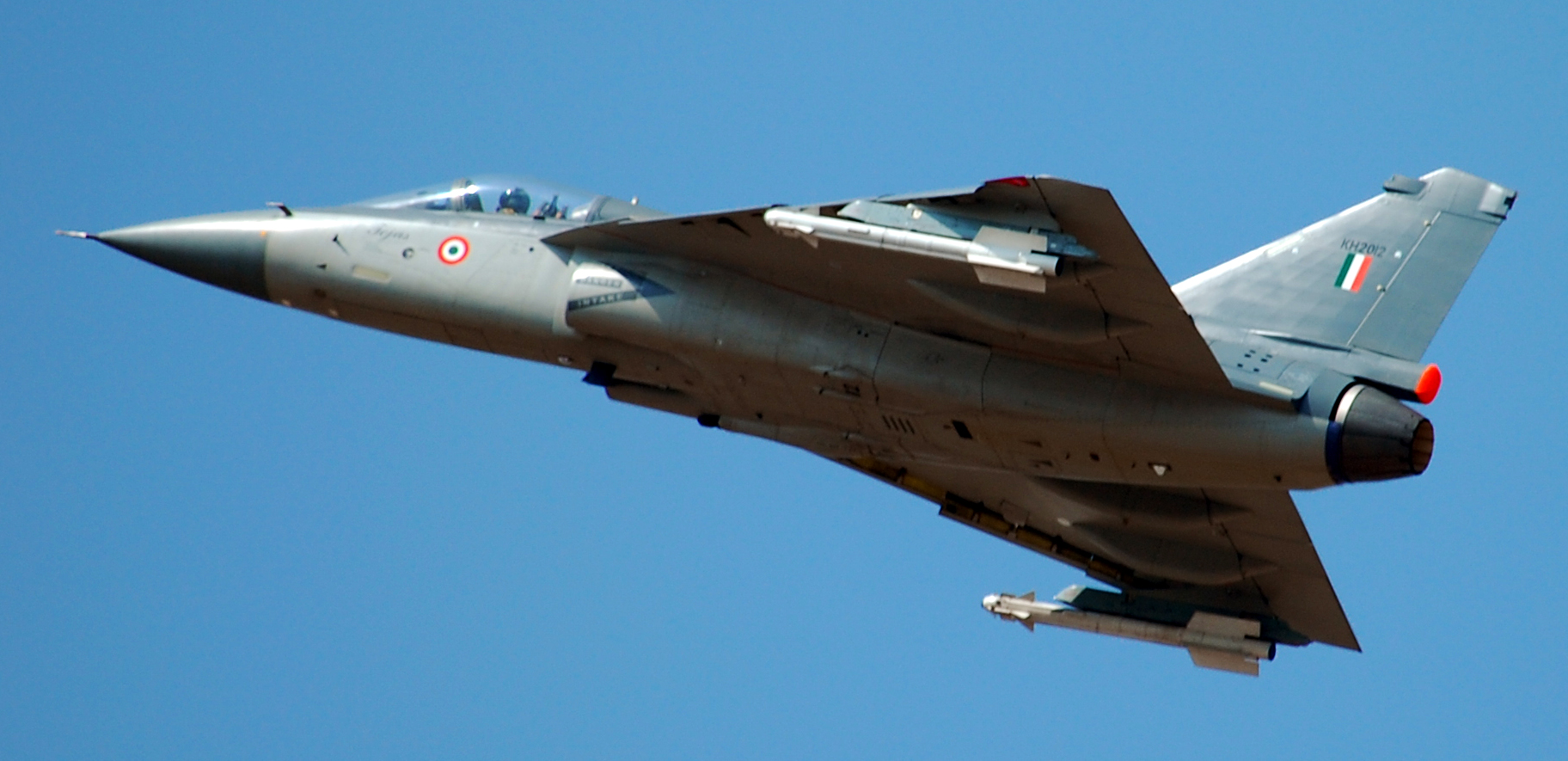
HAL Tejas being flown by ASTE Pilot.

Indian Air Force test pilots, along with a Flight Test Engineer, were killed when the second prototype Saras aircraft crashed and caught fire in an open field near Bangalore. A court of inquiry found that wrong engine relight drills given to the pilots caused the crash.

The year 1957 brought further challenges to A&ATU in the form of Gnat evaluation. Gnat aircraft had not yet been fully evaluated in UK when the task of evaluating this compact fighter for tropical conditions was assigned to A&ATU.

A&ATU geared up to meet this new task by setting up various sections and Flight test instrumentation laboratories. Within next three months, many test-handling sorties were flown and a detailed report – the first of many full-fledged reports generated by the unit was submitted to the Government.

After the Gnat evaluation, the unit was busy with trials on Vampire, Mystere and Hunter aircraft. In 1961, a team from Boscombe Down UK, arrived for tropical trials on the Saunders Roe P-53C Scout helicopter, giving A&ATU its first exposure to rotary wing testing. Trials on a de Havilland Canada Otter soon followed, adding transport flying expertise to the repertoire. The next major evaluation for A&ATU came up in 1964. Hindustan Aeronautics Limited, Bangalore had developed the first indigenous fighter aircraft HF-24 Marut, which was to be evaluated. In 1964, A&ATU also carried out trials on Krishak aircraft.

The late 1960s were productive years for the indigenous aviation industry. A&ATU was tasked with preview and evaluation trials for HJT-16 Hindustan Jet Trainer (Kiran), Indian variants of Alouette helicopter, Chetak and Cheetah, and Marut developmental test programme. In addition, the unit carried out trials on HS748 (AVRO) medium transport aircraft, which was thereafter inducted into IAF.

Jaguar aircraft were inducted into IAF in 1980. Along with it came technology transfer and a licence for manufacture in India. HAL and ASTE once more became the centre stage for developmental trials on advanced avionics, low-end electronic systems like the radio altimeter, VHF communication sets and other instruments.

During November 1980, Air Commodore P Singh, the Commandant of ASTE, led an IAF delegation to France for evaluation of Mirage 2000. In the next year Air Cmde P Singh led yet another delegation to the USSR for evaluation and acquisition of MiG-27 and MiG-23 aircraft. In the same year, Wg Cdr P Rajkumar, Wg Cdr Parab and Fit Lt AMS Kahlon completed flight evaluation of the An-32. This aircraft was to become the backbone of IAF's tactical transport operations from then on.

== Crest ==
The ASTE crest shows a futuristic aircraft carrying guided weapons ringed by an ellipse. A slide-rule is superimposed on the fuselage of the aircraft The slide-rule portrays precision and accuracy needed during flight-testing. It also signifies the aspects of technical knowledge and training involved in producing test pilots and test engineers. The missiles represent armament that forms the major preoccupation of ASTE as a defence services establishment. The ring portrays significant aspects of the role of ASTE. First of all, it depicts the sighting ring of a gun sight, which symbolises not only the involvement of ASTE with armament, but also its concern for constant vigil on correct aims and objectives. Secondly, it symbolises the aiming circles provided on the ground targets as seen from the air and signifies the need for accuracy of results to be obtained during flight testing. The crest also symbolises the aspirations and ambitions of ASTE in involving itself with the country's future plans in the realm of aerospace, The words 'Aircraft and Systems Testing Establishment' and 'Indian Air Force' are inscribed on the roundel in a light blue background. The 'Ashok Stambh' heads the crest and laurel leaves surround the crest. The motto printed on the crest "Sukshamta Avum Utkarsh", means "Precision and Excellence", two invariable and steadfast goals to which ASTE aims, in everything it does.

== Commandants ==
Sl.No.	Name	Period
01	Sqn Ldr Bhopinder Singh	Jun 57 to Nov 59
02	Sqn Ldr Suranjan Das	Nov 59 to Jun 61
03	Wg Cdr JJ Bouche	Jun 61 to Jan 64
04	Wg Cdr BK Ghosh	Jan 64 to Jun 68
05	Wg Cdr Karan Yadav	Jun 68 to Dec 69
06	Wg Cdr/ Gp Capt Kapil Bhargava VM	Jan 70 to Dec 72
07	Gp Capt/ Air Cmde CV Gole PVSM AVSM	Dec 72 to Aug 74
08	Gp Capt/ Air Cmde RD Sahni	Aug 74 to Dec 77
09	Air Cmde PK Dey AVSM	Jan 78 to Jul 79
10	Air Cmde P Singh AVSM VM & Bar	Jul 79 to Sep 82
11	Air Cmde Palamadai Muthuswamy Ramachandran AVSM SC VM	Oct 82 to Dec 84
12	AVM PK Dey AVSM	Jan 85 to Jul 86
13	Air Cmde/ AVM AS Lamba Vr C	Aug 86 to Apr 91
14	Air Cmde P Rajkumar AVSM VM	May 91 to Jul 93
15	Air Cmde SC Rastogi VSM	Jul 93 to Jan 96
16	Air Cmde AK Thakur	Jan 96 to Dec 96
17	Air Cmde P Mehra VM	Jan 97 to Jan 99
18	Air Cmde Parvez Khokar VM	Jan 99 to Jan 01
19	Air Cmde AK Nagalia VM VSM	Jan 01 to Mar 02
20	Air Cmde Anil Chopra VM VSM	Mar 02 to Dec 04
21	Air Cmde PR Sharma	Dec 04 to Dec 06
22	Air Cmde M Matheswaran VM	Dec 06 to May 8
23	Air Cmde Jose Mathappan VSM	May 8 to Dec 10
24	Air Cmde BR Krishna, SC	Dec 10 to Dec 11
25	AVM R Nambiar VM & Bar	Dec 11 to 2014
26	AVM Rajeev Hora	2014 to Nov 2016
27	AVM Sandeep Singh	Nov 2016 to Dec 2018
28	AVM Shridher Kishore Mohlah	Jan 2019 to May 2020
29	AVM Jeetendra Mishra VSM	Jun 2020 to Dec 2022
30	AVM Tejpal Singh	Jan 2023 to October 2024
31	AVM Dharmendra Singh Dhangi	October 2024 to Present

== See also ==
- Indian National Defence University
- Military Academies in India
- Sainik school
- List of test pilot schools
- Indian Army
- Indian Navy
