= No. 28 Squadron IAF =

No. 28 Squadron IAF The First Supersonics
- Insignia of The No. 28 Squadron "The First Supersonics"
- Active: 23 March 1963- Present
- Country: Republic of India
- Allegiance: Indian Armed Forces
- Branch: Indian Air Force
- Role: Multirole
- Garrison/HQ: AFS Adampur
- Nickname: "First Supersonics"
- Mottos: संहारं च करोति या Determined to Destroy

Aircraft flown
- Fighter: Mikoyan MiG-29

No. 28 Squadron IAF nicknamed The First Supersonics is a squadron of the Indian Air Force (IAF). It is currently based in Adampur, Punjab with the Western Air Command and flies Mikoyan MiG-29s.

== History ==
The squadron's role is air defence and offence. It is known as "The First Supersonics" because it was the first squadron in the IAF to be equipped with supersonic Mikoyan MiG-21s in 1963.

The squadron was initially based in Chandigarh, Ambala Before 1947, later moved to Tezpur, Assam, then Pune, Maharashtra and later to Jamnagar, Gujarat.. They were equipped with MiG 29s in the early 1990s and took part in operations in 2000 in the period of tension between India and Pakistan following the 1999 Kargil War.

=== Lineage ===
- Constituted as No. 28 Squadron (First Supersonics) on 23 March 1963

== Aircraft ==
Aircraft	From	To	Air Base
MiG-21 F13	23 March 1963	August 1966	AFS Chandigarh
MiG-21 PF	November 1964	August 1967	AFS Adampur
MiG-21 FL	March 1966	January 1987	AFS Tezpur
MiG-29	December 1987	Present	AFS Adampur

=== Assignments ===
- Indo-Pak war of 1971
