= Empire Test Pilots' School =

British training school for test pilots and flight test engineers

- Logo
- Active: 21 June 1943 – present
- Country: United Kingdom
- Branch: Ministry of Defence (operated by QinetiQ)
- Type: Test pilot school
- Role: Training of test pilots and flight test engineers
- Part of: Air and Space Warfare Centre
- Home station: MOD Boscombe Down
- Nickname: ETPS
- Mottos: Learn to test; test to learn
- Aircraft: Airbus H125; Airbus H145; AgustaWestland A109E/S; AgustaWestland AW139; Avro RJ70/RJ100; Diamond DA42; Grob G 120TP; Beechcraft King Air 350; Pilatus PC-21

The Empire Test Pilots' School (ETPS) is a British training school for test pilots and flight test engineers of fixed-wing and rotary-wing aircraft at MoD Boscombe Down in Wiltshire, England. It was established in 1943, the first of its type. The school moved to RAF Cranfield in October 1945, then to the Royal Aircraft Establishment, Farnborough in July 1947, before returning to Boscombe Down on 29 January 1968.

Its motto is "Learn to test; test to learn".

ETPS is run by the MoD and defence contractor QinetiQ under a long-term agreement.

== History ==
In 1943, Air Marshal Sir Ralph Sorley, Controller, Research and Development, Ministry of Aircraft Production, formed the "Test Pilots' Training Flight" at RAF Boscombe Down after many pilots died testing the many new aircraft introduced during the Second World War.

On 21 June 1943, the unit became the Test Pilots' School within the Aeroplane and Armament Experimental Establishment (A&AEE) at Boscombe Down. The school was "to provide suitably trained pilots for testing duties in aeronautical research and development establishments within the service and the industry". It graduated one group of students, the Number 1 Course, which began in mid-1943 and formally ended on 29 February 1944, before the school's name was changed to the "Empire Test Pilots' School" (ETPS) on 28 July 1944.

The first training course, held by the Commandant, Wing Commander Samuel "Sammy" Wroath with G. Maclaren Humphreys, a civilian, as Technical Instructor, was initially attended by 18 pilots, drawn largely from the Royal Air Force (RAF) and the Fleet Air Arm of the Royal Navy but included three civilian attendees (all from the Bristol Aeroplane Company). Five students found the standard of maths required on the course to be too high and left within the first week; the 13 students who completed the first course comprised 11 from the RAF (including one American, Sqn Ldr JC Nelson, who was serving with one of the Eagle Squadrons) and two from the FAA. Of those who attended No. 1 Course, five eventually died testing aircraft.

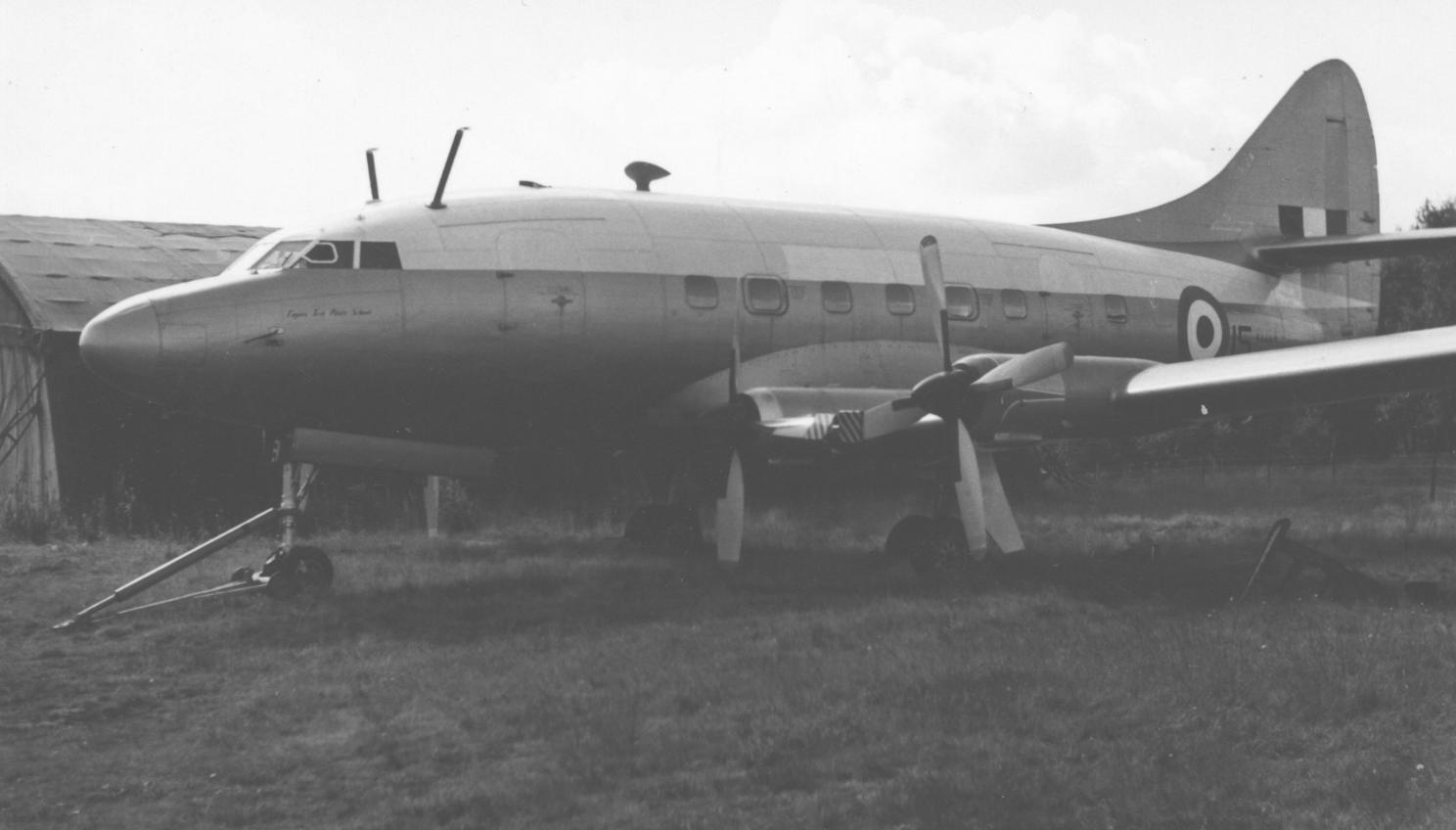
The Armstrong Whitworth Apollo served the ETPS as a multi-engined trainer at Farnborough during the mid-fifties

Due to the rapid growth of the A&AEE, at Boscombe Down, the school moved to RAF Cranfield in October 1945. On 12 July 1947, it was attached to the Royal Aircraft Establishment, Farnborough, where it remained for almost 21 years, flying a wide variety of aircraft types, before returning to Boscombe Down on 29 January 1968.

Until 1963, the course catered to both fixed-wing and rotary-wing pilots, with the latter specializing late in the course. In 1963, a separate rotary-wing course was established, followed in 1974 by a course for Flight test engineers. The school also offers a number of short courses "to meet specific Air Test and Evaluation (AT&E) training needs of the wider flight test community".

In 2001, ETPS was included with those research departments sold off by the Government to Carlyle Group during the formation of QinetiQ. It is now a partnership between QinetiQ and the UK MoD.

The Empire Test Pilots' School was the first of its kind, and was soon followed by other similar schools, such as the U.S. Air Force Test Pilot School at Edwards Air Force Base, California in 1944, the United States Naval Test Pilot School in Maryland in 1945 and the EPNER in France (École du Personnel Navigant d'Essais et de Réception) in 1946. Other schools in India (Indian Air Force Test Pilot School in Bangalore) and Japan were established in later years. Some of these schools operate exchange programmes, which expand the variety of aircraft the students have available to them for gaining flight test experience.

In addition to such student exchanges, British, French and American schools share access to their aircraft, so that students can experience a wider range of aircraft types during their respective courses.

== ETPS Commanding Officers ==
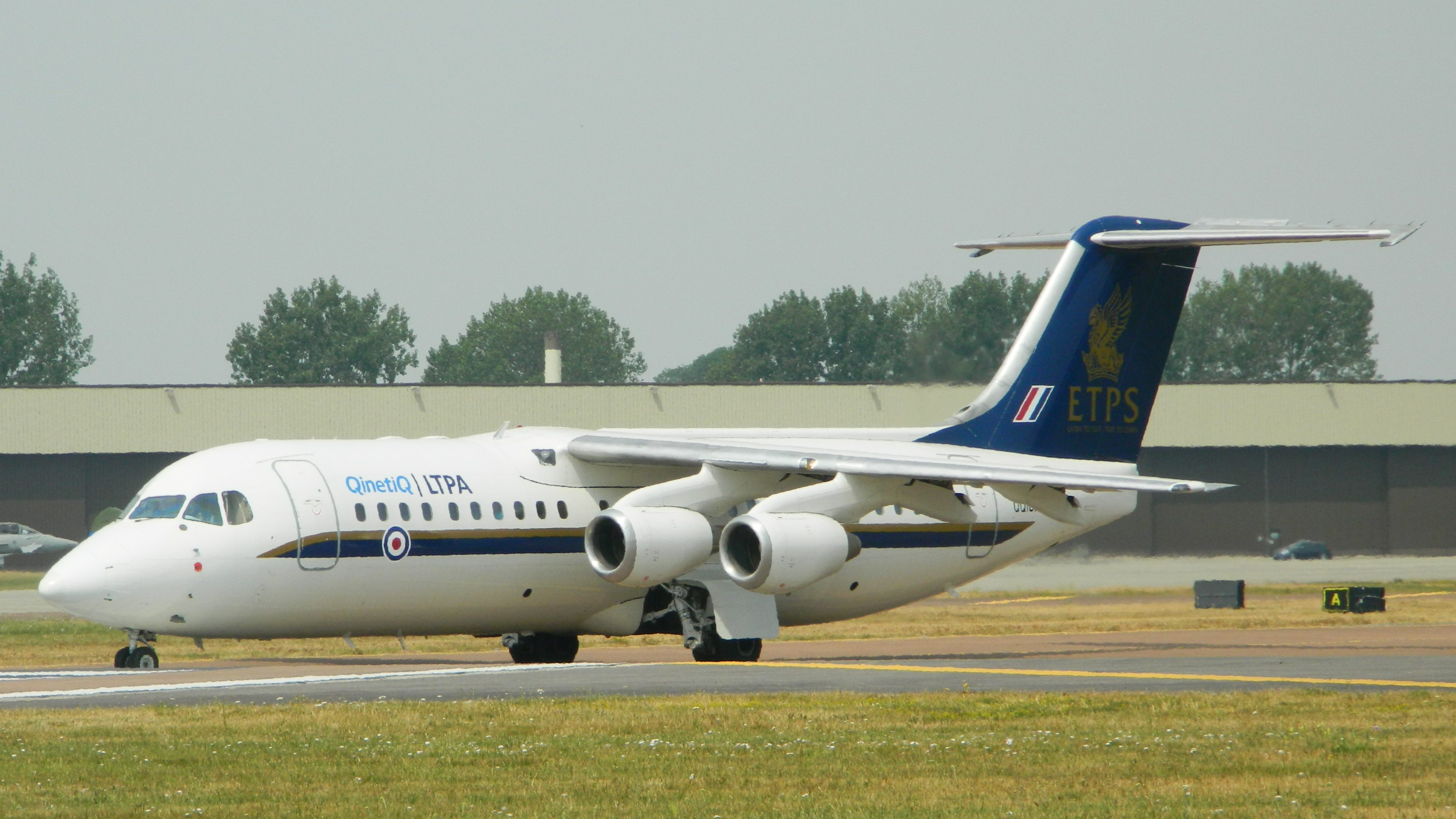
RJ100 in 2013

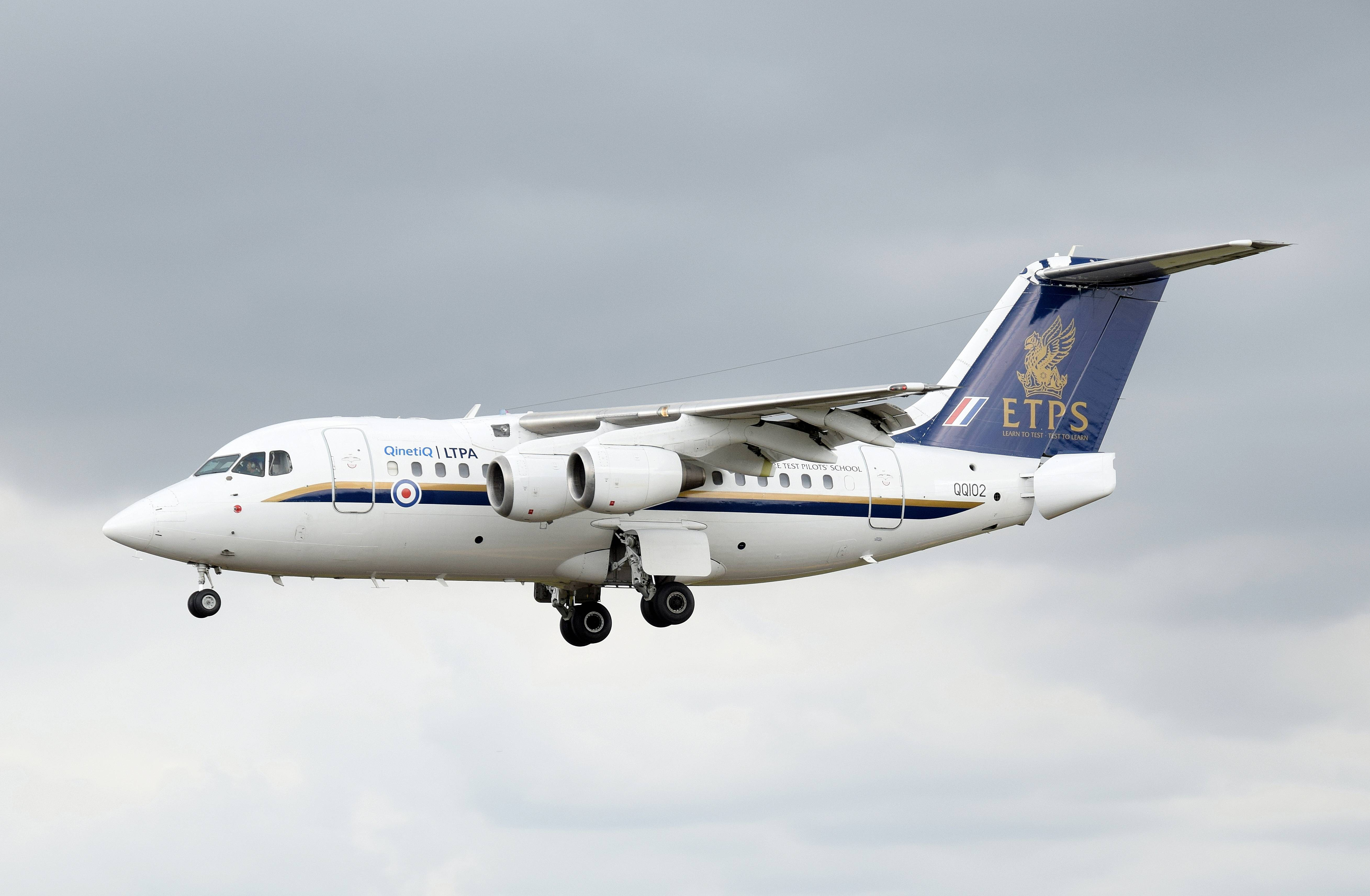
Qinetiq/ETPS BAe Avro 146 RJ70 arrives at the 2017 Royal International Air Tattoo, England. LTPA on the forward fuselage indicates the Long Term Partnering Agreement between Qinetiq and the UK Ministry of Defence

Commandants' names prior to 1968 from the ETPS 25th anniversary brochure; 1968–88, from Wing Commander "Robby" Robinson's "Tester Zero One". The term "Commandant" was succeeded in 1976 by "Chief Instructor" and in 1980 by "Officer Commanding". As the post is now tied to the Royal Navy, it has become "Commanding Officer."

From	Until	Rank/style	Name	Decorations	Service	Country	ETPS course
1943	1944	Wg Cdr	S. Wroath	AFC	RAF	United Kingdom	–
1944	1945	Gp Capt.	JFX McKenna	AFC	RAF	United Kingdom	–
1945	1947	Gp Capt.	HJ Wilson	AFC	RAF	United Kingdom	–
1947	1948	Gp Capt.	S R Ubee	AFC	RAF	United Kingdom	–
1949	1950	Gp Capt.	LS Snaith	AFC	RAF	United Kingdom	–
1950	1953	Gp Capt.	A. E. Clouston	DSO, DFC, AFC	RAF	New Zealand	–
1953	1957	Gp Capt.	S. Wroath	CBE, AFC	RAF	United Kingdom	–
1957	1959	Gp Capt.	RE Burns	CBE, DFC	RAF	United Kingdom	–
1960	1961	Capt.	KR Hickson	AFC and bar	RN	United Kingdom	No. 4 (1946)
1962	1965	Gp Capt.	RA Watts	AFC	RAF	United Kingdom	No. 6 (1947)
1966	1969	Gp Capt.	W. J. P. Straker	AFC	RAF	United Kingdom	No. 9 (1950)
1969	1970	Capt.	P.C.S. Chilton	AFC	RN	United Kingdom	No. 7 (1948)
1971	1973	Gp Capt.	D.P. Hall	AFC	RAF	United Kingdom	No. 18 (1959)
1973	1975	Gp Capt.	H.A. Merriman	CBE, AFC	RAF	United Kingdom	No. 16 (1957)
1975	1976	Gp Capt.	M.K. Adams	AFC	RAF	United Kingdom	No. 22 FW/No. 1 RW (1963)
1976	1977	Wg Cdr	J.A. "Robby" Robinson	AFC	RAF	United Kingdom	No. 21 (1962)
1977	1980	Wg Cdr	J.E. Watts-Phillips	–	RAF	United Kingdom	No. 23 FW (1964)
1981	1985	Wg Cdr	R.S. Hargreaves	Bsc(Eng), MRAeS	–	United Kingdom	EPNER 1965–66
1985	1988	Wg Cdr	J.W.A. Bolton	BSc, MRAeS	RAF	United Kingdom	No. 33 FW (1974)
1988	1991	Wg Cdr	W.L.M. Mayer	AFC, MRAeS	RAF	United Kingdom	No. 7 RW (1969)
1991	1996	Wg Cdr	Robert P. Radley	–	RAF	United Kingdom	–
1996	1998	Wg Cdr	Laurie Hilditch	–	RAF	United Kingdom	(USNTPS Class 100 1991)
1998	2001	Wg Cdr	David Best (pilot)	OBE, Legion of Merit	RAF	United Kingdom	No. 48 FW (1989)
2001	2005	Cdr	'Charlie' Brown	n/a	RN	United Kingdom	No. 47 FW/No. 26 RW (1988)
2006	2007	Cdr	CP Maude	n/a	RN	United Kingdom	n/a
2007	2009	Cdr	Phil Hayde	n/a	RN	United Kingdom	n/a
2010	2012	Cdr	Simon Sparkes	n/a	RN	United Kingdom	No. 37 RW (1999)
2012	2014	Cdr	Mark (Sparky) MacLeod	n/a	RN	United Kingdom	No. 41 RW (2003)
2014	2017	Cdr	Stephen (Croc) Crockatt	n/a	RN	United Kingdom	No. 40 RW (2002)
2017	2019	Cdr	Stuart Irwin	n/a	RN	United Kingdom	No. 50 RW (2012)
2019	2022	Cdr	Steve Moseley	n/a	RN	United Kingdom	USNTPS Class 143 (2013)
2022	2025	Cdr	Ian Houlston	n/a	RN	United Kingdom	No. 54 RW (2016)
2025	-	Cdr	Andrew Johnston	n/a	RN	United Kingdom	No. 52 RW (2014)

== Aircraft ==
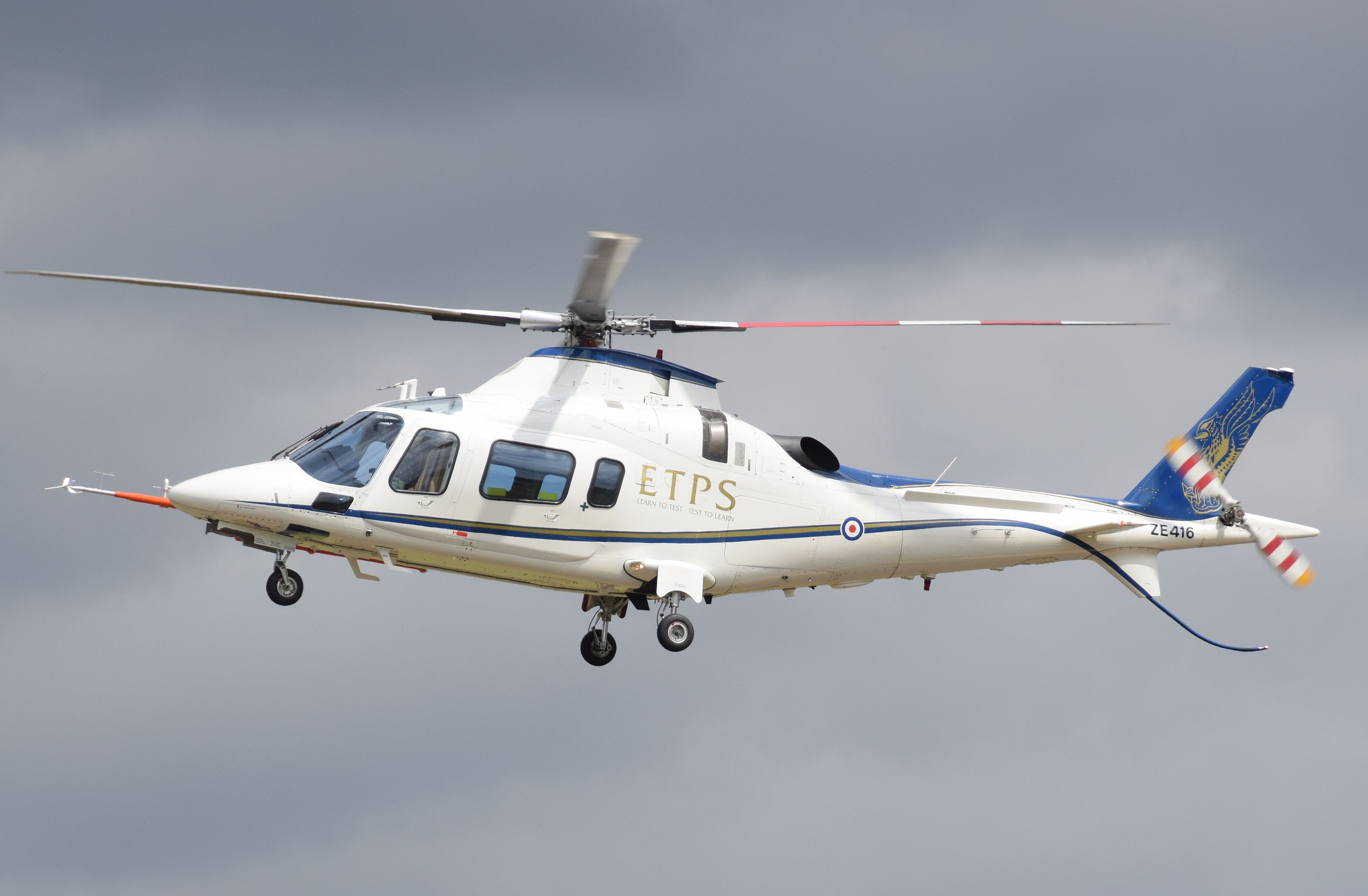
AgustaWestland AW-109E Power (ZE416) of the Empire Test Pilots' School at the 2017 RIAT, England

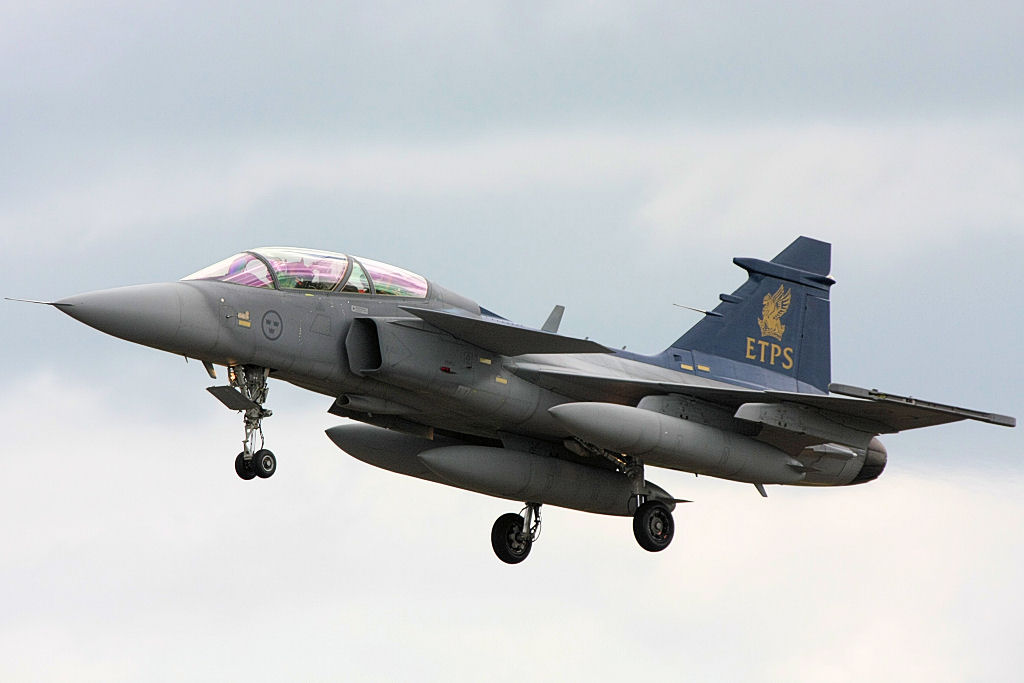
An ETPS Gripen at RIAT 2008

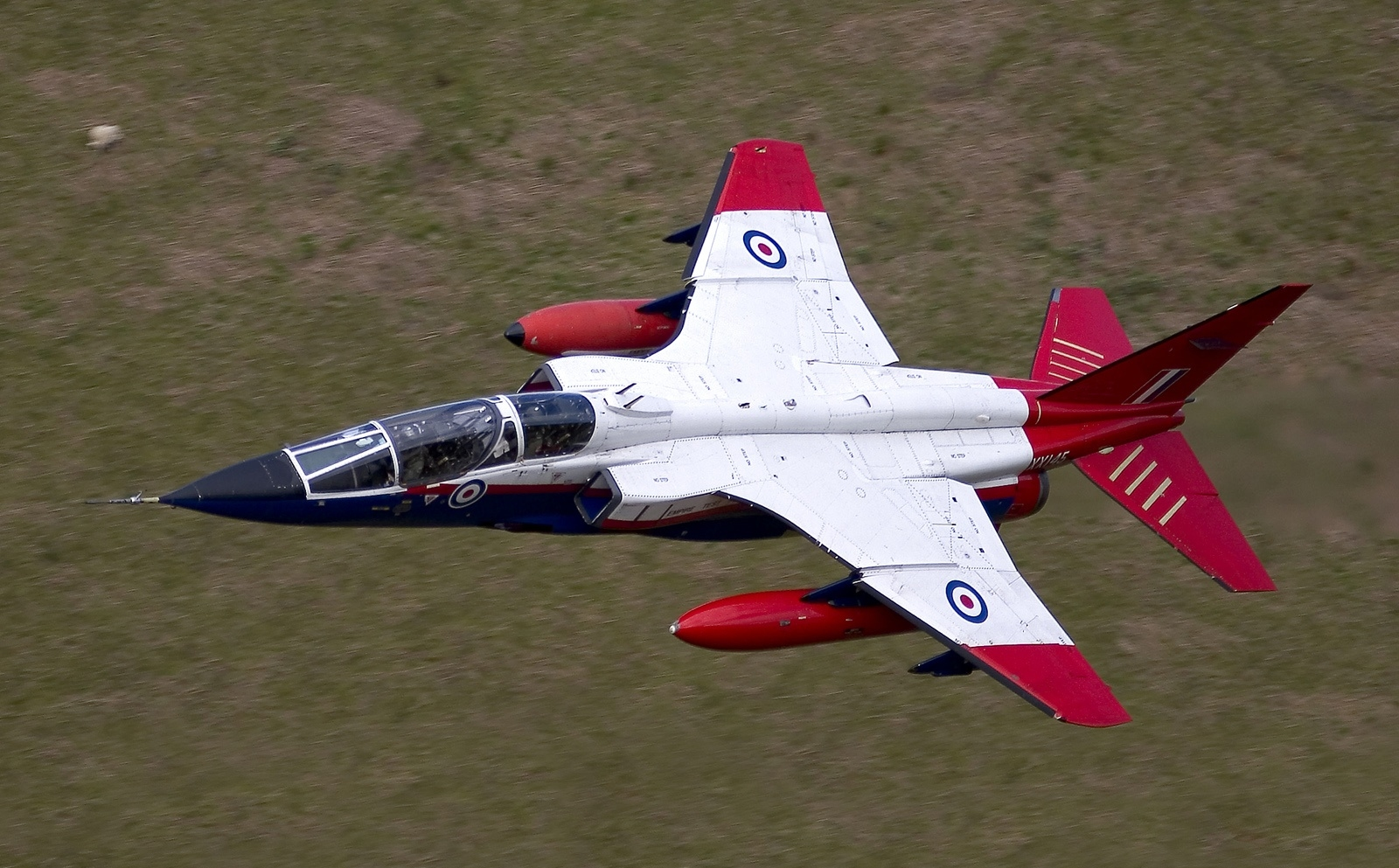
Since retired SEPECAT Jaguar T2 in 2005

The Empire Test Pilots' School fleet consists of the following aircraft:

Aircraft	Origin	Variant(s)	No operated	Notes
Rotary Wing
AW139	Italy	AW139	1	
AW109	Italy	AW109S, AW109E Power	3	
Airbus H125	France	H125	4	
Airbus H145	France	H145	1	
NH90	Europe	NH90 TTH		In partnership with Finnish Defence Forces.
Fixed Wing
Pilatus PC-21	Switzerland	PC-21	2	Custom developed with a flight test instrumentation suite for ETPS.
Grob G120	Germany	G120TP	2	Custom developed with a flight test instrumentation suite for ETPS.
BAE 146	UK	Avro RJ70/100	2	Used as a flying classroom for flight test engineer students.
DA42	Austria	DA42	1	Used to give test pilot students experience with general aviation aircraft.
Eurofighter Typhoon	Europe		1	
Learjet 45	United States	Learjet 45	4	Operated by Calspan in the US.
Saab JAS 39 Gripen	Sweden			On Wet lease
GB1 GameBird	UK	GB1		
Airbus A350	France	A350		Delivered by Airbus & SAS Flight Test Department.

In the past the school has operated: BAe Hawk T.1 XX343, Dassault/Dornier Alpha Jet, Hawker Siddeley Andover XS606, Beagle Basset, Westland Gazelle, North American Harvard, SEPECAT Jaguar, Westland Lynx, Westland Sea King, Panavia Tornado, Short Tucano, Eurocopter Squirrel, Bell 412, Bell 205, Saab Gripen, BAC Jet Provost, English Electric Lightning, Westland Scout.

== ETPS graduates ==
ETPS graduates who have made significant contributions to aviation and/or space exploration.

To collapse the expanded table, click on "hide"; to expand the collapsed table, click on "show" in the Name column header.

Name	Course	Year	Comments
Adenot, Sophie	RW	2018	French Air and Space Force helicopter pilot and member of the European Astronaut Corps
Baudry, Patrick	No. 37 FW	1978	Flew aboard NASA's Space Shuttle 1985 mission STS-51-G.
Best, Dave	No. 48FW	1989	MOD Chief Test Pilot. NATO Air Operations Director. Founder, Nova Systems Europe.
de Winne, Frank	No. 51 FW	1992	The first European Space Agency astronaut to command a space mission when he served as commander of the 2009 International Space Station Expedition 21, his second ISS mission.
Cheli, Maurizio	No. 47 FW	1988	European Space Agency astronaut aboard Space Shuttle mission STS-75 (with Claude Nicollier, another ETPS graduate) in 1995.
Duke, Neville	No. 4/5	1946/7	World War II Fighter ace, later test pilot at Hawker Aircraft. On 7 September 1953, Duke set a new world air speed record of 727.63 mph (1,171.01 km/h), flying Hunter WB188.
Giddings, Michael	No. 4/5	1946/7	Air Marshal Sir Kenneth Charles Michael Giddings KCB, OBE, DFC, AFC & Bar
Goodhart, Nicholas	No. 4	1946	Rear Admiral H.C.Nicholas 'Nick' Goodhart, CB, Legion of Merit, FRAeS, RN rtd, invented the mirror-sight deck landing system for aircraft carriers; record-breaking glider pilot; holder of the Royal Aero Club's silver medal and the FAI's Paul Tissandier Diploma for "those who have served the cause of Aviation in general and Sporting Aviation in particular, by their work, initiative, devotion or in other ways"
Haigneré, Jean-Pierre	No. 40 FW	1981	French Air Force pilot, later CNES and ESA cosmonaut on the 1993 Franco-Russian Altaïr and 1999 Soyuz TM-29 missions to the Mir space station
Hammond, L. Blaine Jr.	No. 40 FW	1981	USAF pilot and NASA astronaut; flew on Space Shuttle missions STS-39 and STS-64
Hathaway, Jack	FW	2011	US Navy pilot and NASA astronaut
Iven Carl Kincheloe Jr.	No. 12	1954	USAF test pilot
McCulley, Michael J.	–	–	Captain, US Navy and NASA astronaut who was pilot of the 1989 Space Shuttle mission STS-34
Muehlberg, John R.	No. 2	1944/45	Lt Col. USAF, first Commandant of the US Air Force Test Pilot School
Nicholson, Peter	No. 32 FW	1973	Air Vice-Marshal Peter Nicholson, appointed Air Commander Australia on 9 April 1996; admitted as an Officer of the Order of Australia in the 1999 Australia Day Honours
Nicollier, Claude	No. 47 FW	1988	First astronaut from Switzerland; has flown on four Space Shuttle missions: STS-46, STS-61, STS-75 (with Maurizio Cheli, another ETPS graduate) and STS-103; full professor of Spatial Technology at the École Polytechnique Fédérale de Lausanne from 2007
Peake, Timothy	No. 43 RW	2005	Former British Army Air Corps helicopter pilot, he is the first British citizen to be selected as an astronaut by ESA.
Pogue, Bill	No. 22 FW	1963	Pilot of Skylab 4 (1973–74).
Strachan, Ian	No. 28 FW	1969	Initially specialised in Air-to-Air Refuelling, adding new types such as Belfast, Nimrod, VC10. Later Chief Test Pilot at RAE Farnborough and developed night low flying in fast jets using TV screens. Added Full Flight Simulators (FFS) to UK Ministry of Defence policy. First Chair of the International Gliding Commission Flight Recorder Approval Committee (IGC GFAC)
Tognini, Michel	No. 41 FW	1982	French and ESA astronaut who served on the 1992 Soyuz TM-15 and 1999 Space Shuttle Columbia STS-93 missions.
Twiss, Peter	No. 3	1945	On 10 March 1956 in the Fairey Delta 2, a supersonic delta-winged research plane, Twiss raised the world air speed record from 822.1 mph (1,323 km/h) to 1,132 mph (1811 km/h). The FD2 was the first aircraft to exceed 1,000 mph in level flight.
Worden, Al	No. 23 FW	1964	Command module pilot for the 1971 Apollo 15 Moon mission.
Żurakowski, Janusz	No. 2	1944/45	Highly decorated Polish and RAF World War II Spitfire pilot, later test pilot with Glosters (Meteor, Javelin) and Avro Canada (Arrow).

== Course trophies and awards ==
Recipients' names prior to 1968 are taken from the ETPS 25th anniversary brochure. Others up to and including 1983, unless otherwise stated, from Rawlings & Sedgwick 1991, pp. 124–36.

In the tables of trophy winners the following abbreviation are used in the course names:

- FW: Fixed wing
- RW: Rotary wing
- FTE: Flight test engineer

Legend
The individual was killed in an aviation accident.

=== McKenna Trophy ===
In memory of the second Commandant of the School, Group Captain JFX McKenna, AFC, killed in a flying accident while serving in that post. (Note: On 19 January 1945 flying a North American Mustang IV, when an ammunition box cover detached at high speed, causing structural failure of a wing. The aircraft crashed on the perimeter of Old Sarum airfield.) In the past the school awarded the McKenna Trophy to the best fixed-wing student.

The award is now given to the student Test Pilot or Flight Test Engineer (Fixed or Rotary) who exhibited the best example of the spirit of aircraft test and evaluation throughout the year.

To expand the collapsed table, click on "show" in the Year column header; to collapse again, choose "hide".

Winners of the McKenna Trophy
Year	Course	Rank/style	Name	Decorations	Employer	Country
1945	No. 3	Wg Cdr	Derek Randal Cuming	AFC*	RAAF	Australia
1945	No. 4	No award; short course				
1946/47	No. 5	Sqn Ldr	WM Foster	DFC	RCAF	Canada
1947	No. 6	Sqn Ldr	RW Whittome (Note: Sqn Ldr Whittome died in a flying accident in a Spitfire in 1948.)	OBE, DFC	RAF	United Kingdom
1948	No. 7	Lt	J. Elliot	–	RN	United Kingdom
1949	No. 8	Cdr	JG Smith	–	USN	US
1950	No. 9	Flt Lt	GA Heck	–	RCAF	Canada
1951	No. 10	Flt Lt	JK Hough (Note: Flt Lt Hough died in a flying accident in a Sycamore in 1953.)	AFC	RAF	United Kingdom
1952	No. 11	n/a	RJ Ross (Note: Ross died in a flying accident in a Javelin in 1954.)	–	RAF	United Kingdom
1953	No. 12	Capt.	BOJ Fryklund (Note: Capt. Fryklund died in a flying accident in 1954.)	–	Swedish Air Force	Sweden
1954	No. 13	Flt Lt	VJ Hill	DFC	RAAF	Australia
1954	No. 13	Capt.	Riccardo Bignamini (Note: Retired from the Italian Air Force in the same year, and become the chief test pilot for FIAT Aviazione. Died during a Jet-Assisted Take Off test flight at Fort Rucker, USA, on July 27th 1961, flying a FIAT G-91 R/3. See https://www.cosenostre-online.it/2021/09/sessantanni-fa-moriva-il-pilota-riccardo-bignamini/)	–	Italian Air Force	Italy
1955	No. 14	Lt	RE Moore	–	USN	
1956	No. 15	Lt Cdr	JS Humphreys	–	RN	United Kingdom
1956	No. 15	Lt	JA Hablot	–	French Navy	France
1957	No. 16	Lt Cdr	TC Evans	AFC	RN	United Kingdom
1958	No. 17	Flt Lt	CV Gole	–	Indian Air Force	India
1959	No. 18	Sqn Ldr	HR Radford	–	RAF	United Kingdom
1960	No. 19	Lt Cdr	LN Hoover	–	USN	US
1961	No. 20	Flt Lt	CC Rustin	–	RAF	United Kingdom
1962	No. 21	Capt.	JI Meeker (Note: Died in an accident in an F-100 Super Sabre while on Reserve training with the Air National Guard in 1965.)	–	USAF	US
1963	No. 22 FW	Flt Lt	MK Adams	–	RAF	United Kingdom
1964	No. 23 FW	Flt Lt	TE Riddihough	–	RAF	United Kingdom
1965	No. 24 FW	Flt Lt	SC Fisher	–	RAAF	Australia
1966	No. 25 FW	Capt.	DT Ward	–	USAF	US
1967	No. 26 FW	Lt Cdr	VW Klein	–	USN	US
1968	No. 27 FW	Flt Lt	AA Clark	–	RAF	United Kingdom
1969	No. 28 FW	Flt Lt	R. Ledwidge	–	RAF	United Kingdom
1970	–	Mr	AR Baker	–	Civil Aviation Branch	Canada
1971	No. 30 FW	Sqn Ldr	Pete Sedgwick	–	RAF	United Kingdom
1972	No. 31 FW	Flt Lt	Terry Farquharson	–	RAAF	Australia
1973	No. 32 FW	Flt Lt	Peter Nicholson	–	RAAF	Australia
1974	No. 33 FW	Flt Lt	John WA Bolton	–	RAF	United Kingdom
1975	No. 34 FW	Lt Cdr	Tom Morgenfeld	–	USN	USA
1976	No 35 FW	Lt	Paul Habert	–	French Navy	France
1977	n/a	Flt Lt	Trevor Ralston	–	South African Directorate of Civil Aviation	South Africa
1978	No. 37 FW	Flt Lt	Graham Tomlinson	–	RAF	United Kingdom
1979	–	–	D. Reeh	–	RAF	United Kingdom
1980	No. 39 FW	F/O	John Blackburn	–	RAAF	Australia
1981	–	–	J. Barnett	–	RAF	United Kingdom
1982	–	–	RN Woodward	–	RAAF	Australia
1983	–	–	PD Dye	–	RAF	United Kingdom
1984	No 22 RW	Maj.	Mario Renzo Ottone	–	Italian Air Force	Italy
1985	No. 44 FW	Flt Lt	Dave Southwood	–	RAF	United Kingdom
1986	–	–	–	–	–	–
1987	–	–	–	–	–	–
1988	No. 47 FW	Capt.	Maurizio Cheli	–	Italian Air Force	Italy
1989	No. 48 FW	Flt Lt	Dave Best	–	RAF	United Kingdom
1990	–	–	–	–	–	–
1991	–	–	–	–	–	–
1992	n/a	n/a	Frank De Winne	–	Belgian Air Force	Belgium
1993	No. 52 FW	Sqn Ldr	Rhys Williams	–	RAF	United Kingdom
1994	–	–	–	–	–	–
1995	–	–	–	–	–	–
1996	n/a	Lt Cdr	Paul Stone	–	RN	United Kingdom
1997	No.56 FW	Flt Lt	Thomas Lyons	–	RAF	United Kingdom
1998	–	–	–	–	–	–
1999	No. 58 FW	Maj.	Richard Ljungberg	–	SwAF	Sweden
2000	–	–	–	–	–	–
2001	No. 60 FW	Capt.	Todd C. Ericson	–	USAF	USA
2002	No. 61 FW	Flt Lt	Chetan Takalkar	–	RAAF	Australia
2003	No. 62 FW	Flt Lt	Stephen Austin	–	RAF	United Kingdom
2004	No. 63 FW	Flt Lt	Jim Schofield	–	RAF	United Kingdom
2005	–	–	–	–	–	–
2006	–	–	–	–	–	–
2007	n/a	n/a	Tytus Rogoyski	–	RAAF	Australia
2008	–	–	–	–	–	–
2009	No. 47 RW	Lt Cdr	Ben Lewis	–	RN	United Kingdom
2010	No. 48 RW	Flt Lt	Russell Cripps	–	RAF	United Kingdom
2011	No. 49 RW	Capt.	ENM Vink	–	RNLAF	Netherlands
2012	No. 50 RW	Lt	W. Allem	–	USN	United States
2013	No. 72 FW	Maj	T.W. Robarge	–	USAF	United States
2014	No. 52 RW	Lt	M.de. Koning	–	RNN	Netherlands
2015	No. 74 FW	Sqn Ldr	G.P. Gogerty	–	RAF	United Kingdom
2016	No. 75 FW	Flt Lt	J-B G. Croft	–	RAF	United Kingdom
2017	No. 41 FTE	IPA	J-B Saint-Pierre	–	DGA	France
2018	No. 56 RW	Cdt	S. Adenot	–	FAF	France
2019	No. 43 FTE	Flt Lt	B. Kilkenny	–	RAAF	Australia
2020	No. 79 FW	Flt Lt	R. Curran	–	RAF	United Kingdom
2021	No. 59 RW	Lt	T. Lofthouse	–	RN	United Kingdom
2022	No. 60 RW	Capt	B. Morrissey	–	AAAvn	Australia
2023	No. 82 FW	Flt Lt	M. McNamara	–	RAF	United Kingdom
2024	No. 83 FW	Lt Cdr	M. Huxtable	–	RN	United Kingdom
2025	No. 49 FTE	Flt Lt	Martyn Matt	–	RAF	United Kingdom

=== Edwards Trophy ===
This trophy is awarded by the Edwards Air Force Base in California to the student who makes the greatest progress on the course.

To expand the collapsed table, click on "show" in the Year column header; to collapse the expanded table, click on "hide".

Winners of the Edwards Trophy
Year	Course	Rank/style	Name	Decorations	Employer	Country
1958	No. 17	Flt Lt	RA Whyte	–	RAF	United Kingdom
1959	No. 18	Flt Lt	JM Henderson	–	RAF	United Kingdom
1960	No. 19	Flt Lt	GM Morrison	–	RAF	United Kingdom
1961	No. 20	Flt Lt	PJ Farris	–	RAF	United Kingdom
1962	No. 21	Flt Lt	PM Ramachandran	–	Indian Air Force	India
1963	No. 22 FW	Flt Lt	P. Ashoka	–	Indian Air Force	India
1963	No. 1 RW	Flt Lt	RF Mundy	–	RAF	United Kingdom
1964	No. 23 FW	Lt	PEH Banfield	–	RN	United Kingdom
1965	No. 24 FW	Lt	W. Davies	–	USN	USA
1966	No. 4 RW	Lt	PJG Harper	–	RN	United Kingdom
1967	No. 26 FW	Flt Lt	ADA Cooke	–	RAF	United Kingdom
1968	–	–	HD Williams	–	Army Air Corps	United Kingdom
1969	–	–	VF Champion	–	French Navy	France
1970	–	–	W. Spychiger	–	Swiss Air Force	Switzerland
1971	No. 30 FW	Lt Cdr	Chris Hägg	–	Royal Swedish Navy	Sweden
1972	n/a	Capt.	Ashalom Rom	–	Israeli Air Force	Israel
1973	–	–	PC Tait	–	RAF	United Kingdom
1974	–	Flt Lt	Ian E. "Jak" Frost	–	RAF	United Kingdom
1975	–	Lt.	Bruno Belluci	–	Italian Air Force	Italy
1976	–	–	FC Lentz	–	US Navy	USA
1977	n/a	Flt Lt	John Foley	–	RAAF	Australia
1978	n/a	Lt	Nigel Armall-Culliford	–	RN	United Kingdom
1980	n/a	Maj.	Horst Hickl	–	German Air Force	Federal Republic of Germany
1981	No. 19 RW	Capt.	N. Talbot	–	Army Air Corps	United Kingdom
1982	No. 41 FW	Flt Lt	Simon J. Wood	–	RAF	United Kingdom
1983	–	–	JA Goddard	–	RAF	United Kingdom
1984	–	–	–	–	–	–
1985	No. 44 FW	Flt Lt	R. Meiklejohn	–	Canadian Armed Forces	Canada
1986	No. 24 RW	Lt	Sigmund Lockert	–	Royal Norwegian Air Force	Norway
1991	No. 15 FTE	n/a	Anthony L. Dyer	–	–	United Kingdom

=== Hawker Hunter Trophy ===
This trophy, a model of the Hawker Hunter, was first awarded in 1960 by the Hawker Aircraft Company to the student who wrote the best Preview Handling report on the course. Since 1966 syndicates of two or three students have carried out the Preview Exercise.

The trophy is now awarded to the fixed wing preview team who, in the opinion of the staff, through planning, flying and reporting, and in their conduct as a team, delivered the best performance in the assessment of their aircraft.

To expand the collapsed table, click on "show" in the Year column header; to collapse again, click on "hide".

Winners of the Hawker Hunter Trophy
Year	Course	Rank/style	Name	Decorations	Employer	Country
1960	–	–	IH Keppie	–	RAF	United Kingdom
1961	–	–	HWA Deacon	–	Royal Navy	United Kingdom
1962	–	–	G. Varin	–	French Air Force	France
1963	–	–	P. Ashoka	–	Indian Air Force	India
1964	–	–	MW Buss	–	US Air Force	US
1965	–	–	SC Fisher	–	RAAF	Australia
1966	–	–	DW Gates	–	RAF	United Kingdom
1966	–	–	SG Pearce (Note: Died in a flying accident on 10 August 1976.)	–	RAF	United Kingdom
1966	–	–	NRJ Wingate	–	RAF	United Kingdom
1967	–	–	GJ McIntosh	–	RAF	United Kingdom
1967	–	–	RC O'Day	–	Royal Australian Navy	Australia
1968	–	–	BPL Stokes	–	RAF	United Kingdom
1968	–	–	RV Richardson	–	RAAF	Australia
1968	–	–	GA Peterkin	–	RAAF	Australia
1969	–	Mr	K. Koglin	–	–	Federal Republic of Germany
1969	–	–	BA Wilson	–	RAAF	Australia
1969	–	–	U. Yaari	–	Israeli AF	Israel
1970	–	–	RG Davis	–	RAF	United Kingdom
1970	–	–	B. le Cornec	–	French AF	France
1970	–	–	HF Rammensee	–	–	Federal Republic of Germany
1971	–	Capt.	Eugène Coeuret	–	French Air Force	France
1971	No. 30 FW	Sqn Ldr	Pete Sedgwick	–	RAF	United Kingdom
1972	n/a	Mr	Gunter Sprenger	–	German MoD	Federal Republic of Germany
1972	n/a	Flt Lt	Paul Buckland	–	RAF	United Kingdom
1972	n/a		Colin Hague	–	RN	United Kingdom
1973	–	–	RH Beazley	–	RAF	United Kingdom
1973	–	–	JH Finney	–	US Navy	USA
1974	No. 12 RW	Lt	Dave Beswick	–	RN	United Kingdom
1974		Flt Lt	Mike Betts	–	RAF	United Kingdom
1975	No. 34 FW	Flt Lt	Chris Yeo	–	RAF	United Kingdom
1975	n/a	Maj.	Sven Hjort	–	Royal Danish Air Force	Denmark
1976	–	–	AV Awalegaonkar	–	Indian Air Force	India
1976	–	–	MC Hagen	–	RN	United Kingdom
1976	–	–	FC Lentz	–	US Navy	USA
1976	–	–	A. Shaked (Note: A. Shaked died in a flying accident in a Dornier Do 28.)	–	Israeli AF	Israel
1977	n/a	Capt.	Chris Roberts	–	RAF	United Kingdom
1977	n/a	Capt.	Agostino Frediani	–	Italian Air Force	Italy
1978	n/a	Capt.	Pino Marani	–	Italian Air Force	Italy
1978	n/a	Flt Lt	Graham Tomlinson	–	RAF	United Kingdom
1979	–	–	AR Foster	–	RAF	United Kingdom
1979	No. 6 FTE	–	P. Kemsley	–	–	United Kingdom
1980	n/a	F/O	John Blackburn	–	RAAF	Australia
1980	n/a	Lt Cdr	Paul Habel	–	USN	USA
1981	No 40 FW	Sqn Ldr	Jean-Pierre Haigneré	–	French Air Force	France
1982	–	–	TP Newman	–	RAF	United Kingdom
1982	–	–	M. Tognini	–	French AF	France
1983	–	–	–	–	–	–
1984	No 22 RW	Maj.	Mario Renzo Ottone	–	Italian Air Force	Italy
1985	No. 44 FW	Sqn Ldr	Les Evans	–	RAF	United Kingdom
1985	No. 44 FW	Cmdt	Serge Aubert	–	French Air Force	France
1987	No. 46 FW	Lt	SN Hargreaves	–	Royal Navy	United Kingdom Flt Lt G J McClymont RAF
1988	No. 47 FW	Capt.	Maurizio Cheli	–	Italian Air Force	Italy
–	–	–	–	–	–	–
1991	No. 15 FTE	n/a	Anthony L. Dyer	–	–	United Kingdom
1991	No. 15 FTE	Capt.	Lee Obst	–	Canadian Air Force	Canada
1991	No. 15 FTE	Capt.	Peter Ware	–	Singapore Air Force	Singapore
1993	No. 31 RW	Flt Lt	Pete Rowlinson	–	RAF	United Kingdom
1993	No. 31 RW	Capt.	Dave Fawcett	–	A A Avn	Australia
1993	No. 31 RW	Capt.	Georg Fuchs	–	G A Avn	Germany
1995	No. 54 FW	Maj.	Tjebbe "Speedy" Haringa	–	RNLAF	Netherlands
1995	No. 54 FW	Capt.	Bjørn Rygnestad	–	RNoAF	Norway
1997	No.56 FW	Flt Lt	Thomas Lyons	–	RAF	United Kingdom
1997	No.56 FW	Flt Lt	Bruce McDonald	–	RAF	United Kingdom
2001	No. 60 FW	Capt.	Todd C. Ericson	–	USAF	USA
2001	No. 25 FTE	–	Gordon Stewart	–	QinetiQ	United Kingdom

=== Patuxent Shield ===
This trophy, instituted in 1961, was in the past awarded by the U.S. Naval Test Pilot School, Patuxent River, to the runner-up for the McKenna Trophy.

The trophy is now awarded to the rotary wing preview team who, in the opinion of the staff, through planning, flying and reporting, and in their conduct as a team, delivered the best performance in the assessment of their aircraft.

To expand the collapsed table, click on "show" in the Year column header; to collapse again, click on "hide".

Winners of the Patuxent Trophy
Year	Course	Rank/style	Name	Decorations	Employer	Country
1961	No. 20 FW	Flt Lt	JEC Mayes	–	RAF	United Kingdom
1962	No. 21 FW	Sqn Ldr	B. Carroll	–	RAF	United Kingdom
1963	No. 22 FW	Flt Lt	JF Farley	–	RAF	United Kingdom
1964	No. 23 FW	Flt Lt	DL Bywater	–	RAF	United Kingdom
1964	No. 23 FW	Capt.	AM Worden	–	USAF	US
1965	No. 24 FW	Capt.	Lamberto Fe d'Ostiani	–	Italian Air Force	Italy
1966	No. 25 FW	Flt Lt	JT Lewis	–	RAF	United Kingdom
1967	No. 26 FW	Sqn Ldr	BJ Graf	–	RAAF	Australia
1968	–	–	CA Wheal	–	RN	United Kingdom
1969	–	–	JD Blake	–	RAF	United Kingdom
1970	–	–	CJ Furse	–	RAAF	Australia
1971	–	Mr	Carl Lang	–	German MoD	Federal Republic of Germany
1972	No. 31 FW	Flt Lt	John Fawcett	–	RAF	United Kingdom
1973	–	–	DH Jackson	–	RAF	United Kingdom
1974	–	Maj.	GE "Luca" Evangelisti	–	Italian Air Force	Italy
1975	–	–	GA Ellis	–	RAF	United Kingdom
1976	–	–	MC Hagen	–	Royal Navy	United Kingdom
1977	n/a	Flt Lt	Ronald Cowpe	–	RAF	United Kingdom
1978	n/a	Capt.	Patrick Baudry	–	French Air Force	France
1979	–	–	AR Foster	–	RAF	United Kingdom
1980	n/a	F/O	John Blackburn	–	RAAF	Australia
1981	No 40 FW	Sqn Ldr	Jean-Pierre Haigneré	–	French Air Force	France
1982	No. 41 FW	n/a	Michel Tognini	–	French Air Force	France
1983	–	–	B. Van Eyle	–	RAAF	Australia
1984	–	–	–	–	–	–
1987	46 FW	Flt Lt	Henry de Courcier	–	RAF	United Kingdom
1997	No. 35 RW	Lt Cdr	Mark Carretta	–	RN	United Kingdom
1997	No. 35 RW	Lt Cdr	Roger Moffatt	–	RN	United Kingdom
1998	n/a	n/a	Antoine Van Gent	–	RNLAF	Netherlands
1999	No. 37 RW	n/a	Simon Sparkes	–	Royal Navy	United Kingdom
1999	n/a	n/a	n/a	–		Netherlands
2002	No. 40 RW	n/a	Stephen Crockatt	–	Royal Navy	United Kingdom
2005	No. 43 RW	CC	B. Hédé-Hauy	–	French Navy	France
2007	No. 45 RW	CC	M. Barreault	–	French Navy	France
2008	No. 46 RW	Maj.	Frédéric Hauviller	–	French Army Aviation	France
2019	No. 56 RW	Cdt	S. Adenot	–	FAF	France
2019	No. 56 RW	Leut	M. Carter	–	RAN	Australia
2019	No. 42 FTE	Mr	A. Pearson	–	–	–
2020	No. 57 RW	Maj	O. Gibbins	–	AAC	United Kingdom
2020	No. 57 RW	Leut	L. Badger	–	RAN	Australia
2021	No. 58 RW	Capt	M. Degen	–	RNLAF	Netherlands
2021	No. 44 FTE	Mr	S. McQuaid	–	QinetiQ	United Kingdom
2022	No. 59 RW	Capt	G. Brannigan	–	AAAvn	Australia
2022	No. 45 FTE	1Lt	O. Stijnman	–	RNLAF	Netherlands
2023	No. 60 RW	Lt	R. Dunlap	–	USN	United States
2023	No. 46 FTE	Mr	T. Matti	–	Armasuisse	Switzerland
2024	No. 61 RW	Capt	J. Highfield	–	AAAvn	Australia
2024	No. 47 FTE	Capt	P. Williams	–	AAAvn	Australia
2025	No. 63 RW	Major	Adrian Lee	–	RSAF	Singapore
2025	No. 63 RW	Capt	Robbert van der Zee	–	RNLASF	Netherlands

=== Westland Trophy ===
The Westland Trophy, originally presented by Westland Aircraft Limited in 1963, is awarded to the best all-round student on the Rotary Wing Course. The trophy is no longer awarded.

To expand the collapsed table, click on "show" in the Year column header; to collapse again, click on "hide".

Winners of the Westland Trophy
Year	Course	Rank/style	Name	Decorations	Employer	Country
1963	No. 1 RW	Flt Lt	MC Ginn	–	RAF	United Kingdom
1964	No. 2 RW	Lt	M. Hope	–	RN	United Kingdom
1965	No. 3 RW	Lt Cdr	LG Locke	–	RN	United Kingdom
1966	No. 4 RW	Flt Lt	JH Cox	–	RAAF	Australia
1967	No. 5 RW	Flt Lt	LVP Galvin	–	RCAF	Canada
1968	No. 6 RW	–	MFL Purse	–	RN	United Kingdom
1969	No. 7 RW	–	WLM Mayer	–	RAF	United Kingdom
1970	No. 8 RW	Flt Lt	David F Moffat	–	RAF	United Kingdom
1971	No. 9 RW	Flt Lt	John Whitney	–	RAF	United Kingdom
1972	No. 10 RW	Flt Lt	Stuart Collins	–	RAF	United Kingdom
1973	No. 11 RW		KB Engelsmann	–	RAN	Australia
1974	No. 12 RW		M. Betts	–	RAF	United Kingdom
1975	No. 13 RW		T. Creed	–	RAF	United Kingdom
1976	No. 14 RW		JH Allen	–	RAF	United Kingdom
1977	No. 15 RW	Mr	Trevor Ralston	–	South African DCA	South Africa
1978	No. 16 RW	Lt Cdr	David Chapman	–	RN	United Kingdom
1979	No. 17 RW	–	A. Noy	–	Israeli AF	Israel
1980	No. 18 RW	Flt Lt	JEM "Ted" Mustard	–	RAF	United Kingdom
1981	No. 19 RW	–	I. Young	–	RAF	United Kingdom
1982	No. 20 RW	Mr	Raffaele Longobardi	–	–	Italy
1983	No. 21 RW	–	TJ Wood	–	RAF	United Kingdom
1984	No. 22 RW	–	–	–	–	–
1985	No. 23 RW	Lt	Bob Horton	–	RN	United Kingdom
1986	No. 24 RW	–	Eric Fitzpatrick	–	Royal Marines	United Kingdom
1988	No. 26 RW	Capt.	Omri Knoller	–	Israeli AF	Israel
1993	No. 31 RW	Flt Lt	Pete Rowlinson	–	RAF	United Kingdom
1994	No. 32 RW	Lt Cdr	C.D.Taylor	–	RN	United Kingdom
1995	No. 33 RW	CPT	Lim Choon Huat	–	RSAF	Singapore
1997	No. 35 RW	Lt Cdr	Roger Moffatt	–	RN	United Kingdom
1998	No. 36 RW	Lt Cdr	J.P.T.Edwards	–	RN	United Kingdom
2001	No. 39 RW	Capt.	Massimo Bonesi	–	Italian Army Air Cavalry	Italy
2002	No. 40 RW	–	–	–	–	–
2003	No. 41 RW	–	Jacob Bart	–	Royal Netherlands Air Force	Netherlands
2004	No. 42 RW	–	–	–	–	–
2005	No. 43 RW	Maj.	Timothy Peake	–	British Army Air Corps	United Kingdom
2006	No. 44 RW	Lt Cdr	Mark Purvis	–	Royal Navy	United Kingdom
–	–	–	–	–	–	–

=== Sir Alan Cobham Award ===
Presented to ETPS in 1974 by Michael Cobham, son of Sir Alan Cobham, this trophy is awarded to the fixed wing student who demonstrates the highest standard of flying during the course. The trophy is a silver model of a Short Singapore II flying-boat, which was originally awarded to Sir Alan and his wife in 1928 "in commemoration of their epic circuit of Africa flight in 1927 in such a flying-boat". The trophy is no longer awarded.

To expand the collapsed table, click on "show" in the Year column header; to collapse the expanded table, click on "hide".

Winners of the Sir Alan Cobham Trophy
Year	Course	Rank/style	Name	Decorations	Employer	Country
1974	–	Flt Lt	John Thorpe	–	RAF	United Kingdom
1975	No. 34 FW	Flt Lt	Chris Yeo	–	RAF	United Kingdom
1976	–	–	MC Hagen	–	Royal Navy	United Kingdom
1977	n/a	Capt.	Agostino Frediani	–	Italian Air Force	Italy
1978	n/a	Flt Lt	Graham Tomlinson	–	RAF	United Kingdom
1979	–	–	TH Brown	–	RAF	United Kingdom
1980	No. 39 FW	F/O	Tracey McCormick	–	RAAF	Australia
1981	–	–	JJ Barnett	–	RAF	United Kingdom
1982	–	–	DAZ James	–	RAF	United Kingdom
1983	–	–	PD Dye	–	RAF	United Kingdom
1984	–	–	–	–	–	–
1985	No. 44 FW	Flt Lt	Dave Southwood	–	RAF	United Kingdom
1986	–	–	–	–	–	–
1987	–	–	–	–	–	–
1988	No. 47 FW	Capt.	Maurizio Cheli	–	Italian Air Force	Italy
1995	No. 54 FW	Capt	Bjørn Rygnestad	-	RoNAF	Norway
2003	No. 62 FW	Flt Lt	Dave Stobie	–	RAF	United Kingdom
2004	No. 63 FW	Flt Lt	Jim Schofield	–	RAF	United Kingdom

=== Dunlop Trophy ===
The Dunlop Trophy, initially awarded by the Dunlop Rubber company in 1974, is awarded to the best student on each Flight Test Engineers' course. The trophy is no longer awarded.

To expand the collapsed table, click on "show" in the Year column header; to collapse the expanded table, click on "hide".

Winners of the Dunlop Trophy
Year	Course	Rank/style	Name	Decorations	Employer	Country
1974	No. 1 FTE	Mr	John LF Denning	–	–	United Kingdom
1975	No. 2 FTE	–	RJ Humphries	–	–	–
1976	No. 3 FTE	–	JC Martin	–	–	–
1977	No. 4 FTE	Lt	M. Maharik	–	Israeli Air Force	Israel
1978	No. 5 FTE	Lt	David Benedetti	–	Italian Air Force	Italy
1979	No. 6 FTE	–	AM Oliver	–	–	–
1980	No. 7 FTE	Mr	Robert Badham	–	UK MoD	United Kingdom
1981	No. 8 FTE	–	A.J. Houghton	–	–	–
1982	No. 9 FTE	–	K. Jones	–	–	–
1983	No. 10 FTE	–	B.R. Fouques			
1989	No.13 FTE	Lt	Piero Gilberto Serra	No 13 FTE	Italian Air Force	Italy
1990	No 14 FTE	Lt	Vito Casagrande	–	Italian Air Force	Italy
1993	No 17 FTE	Mr	B Dudgeon	–	UK MoD	United Kingdom
1994	No 18 FTE	Capt.	S McIntosh	–	CAF	Canada
1995	No. 19 FTE	Capt.	D.J. Masters	–	CAF	Canada
1998	No. 22 FTE		Antoine Van Gent	–	RNLAF	Netherlands
2000	No. 24 FTE	Maj	Francois Robert	–	CAF	Canada
2001	No. 25 FTE	–	Gordon Stewart	–	QinetiQ	United Kingdom
2002	No 26 FTE	Mr	A. M Roberts	–	QinetiQ	United Kingdom
2003	No. 27 FTE	Maj.	Jeoh Leo	–	Singapore Air Force	Singapore
2004	No 28 FTE	Capt	Anne Ducarouge	-	French Forces	France
–	–	–	–	–	–	–
2008	No.32 FTE	Lt	Alrik Hoencamp	–	RNN	Netherlands
2009	No. 33 FTE	Dr	Clare Chatterjea	–	QinetiQ	United Kingdom
2010	No. 34 FTE	Miss	Gemma Dore	–	QinetiQ	United Kingdom
2011	No. 35 FTE	Capt.	M Desrochers	–	RCAF	Canada
2012	No. 36 FTE	Capt.	I Leong	–	RAEME	Australia
2013	No. 37 FTE	ME4	K.H. Tee	–	RSAF	Singapore
2014	No. 38 FTE	Lt	P Six	–	French Navy	France

== See also ==
- List of test pilot schools
- Rotary Wing Test Squadron
- Boscombe Down
