= National Test Pilot School =

Commercial test-pilot training institute in Mojave, California, United States

Coordinates: 35.056218°N 118.150943°W

- Mojave, California

Information
- Established: 1981
- President: Luca Campello
- Key people: Jeff Trang, NTPS Enterprise CEO

The National Test Pilot School (NTPS) is the only civilian test-pilot school in the United States, located in Mojave, California. It is organized as a not-for-profit educational institute under California state law and is governed by a board of trustees. NTPS is one of the seven test-pilot schools worldwide recognized by the international Society of Experimental Test Pilots, giving pilot graduates of NTPS instant initial acceptance into their society. In 2016, NTPS became the first test-pilot school in the world to be certified as a Flight Test Authorised Training Organisation by the European Aviation Safety Organization.

== History ==
The NTPS grew out of a successful series of introductory flight test courses taught for military test organizations in the United States and Canada. Using an instrumented De Havilland Dove (DH-104), introductory, two-week performance and flying qualities flight test courses were taught for Edwards AFB, California; Patuxent River NAS, Maryland; Eglin AFB, Florida; the Naval Postgraduate School, California; Wright-Patterson AFB, Ohio; and the Aerospace Engineering Test Establishment, CFB Cold Lake, Canada. The success of these courses led to opportunities to teach broader content flight test courses abroad.

The school was formally established as a not-for-profit educational institute in California in April 1981. The initial years of the school consisted of teaching introductory courses within the United States, mainly for military organizations, and teaching longer courses abroad (in Israel, Taiwan, Brazil, and South Africa) using customer aircraft. By 1986, the decision was made to construct a large hangar and classroom complex in Mojave, California. Over the ensuing years, more flight test training was done in Mojave with a growing fleet of aircraft, rather than at customer locations. Today, the school trains 10–30 students in year-long courses with about 200-300 students attending one of several short courses each year.

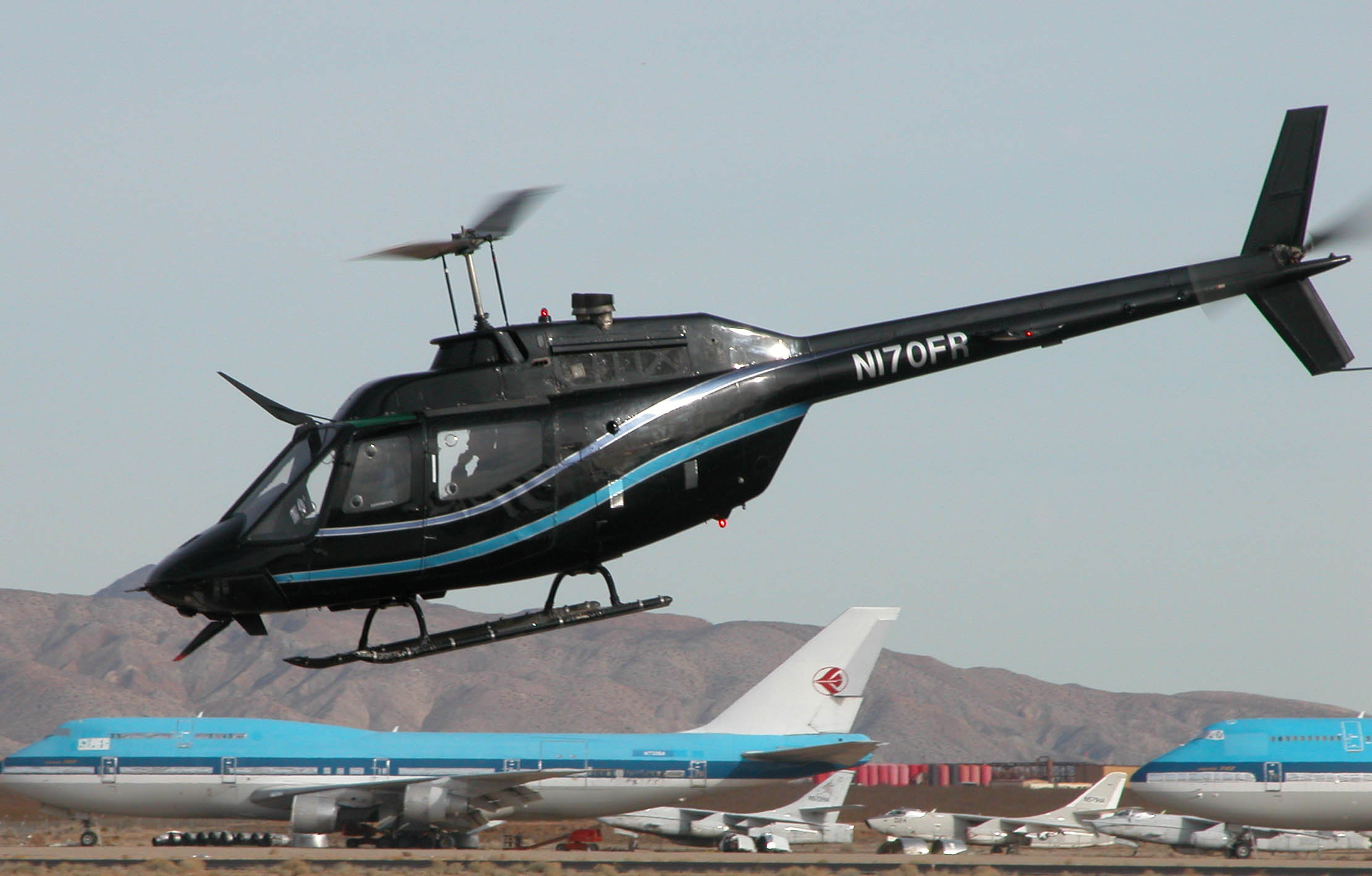
OH-58C of the National Test Pilot School. This type was retired in 2020.

In 2016, NTPS became the first test pilot school in the world to be certified as a Flight Test Authorised Training Organisation by the European Aviation Safety Agency (EASA). Today, NTPS trains military and civilian students from over 30 countries.

In 2020, the OH-58C was retired from service at the NTPS.

In 2023, NTPS acquired Flight Research Inc., a provider of flight training as well as aircraft maintenance. NTPS also announced a new not-for-profit business, Flight Research International LLC.

== Courses ==
=== Professional course ===
The principal course taught at the NTPS is the professional course, which is certified for EASA category 1. It is a one-year-long course covering performance, flying qualities, and avionics systems. Both test pilots and flight test engineers are trained. Portions of the course are specifically tailored for fixed or rotary-wing pilots and engineers. Subsets of the professional course, taught in conjunction with professional course students, are offered routinely:

1. Customers can send students to either the performance and flying qualities (PF&Q) professional course or to the systems professional course, each being around six months in duration.
2. The EASA category 2 course is the core portion of the P&FQ curriculum plus some systems curriculum in a stand-alone course of 20 weeks in duration.
3. Within the professional course, the content is divided into modules, nominally 1–3 weeks in duration, which can be taken for academic credit.

=== Short courses ===
In addition to the professional course, the school has nine regularly scheduled short courses of two to six weeks' duration. These include introductory courses in fixed and rotary wing P&FQ, avionics systems testing, operational test and evaluation, civil certification courses, night-vision systems, production flight testing, and a pretest pilot school course designed as a preparatory course for students planning to attend the professional course.

== Curriculum ==
The NTPS professional course curriculum initially followed the format and flow of the course taught at the US Air Force Test Pilot School. The content was divided among three major components - performance, flying qualities, and systems flight testing, with the flow of the course always was executed in that sequence. Due to customer feedback, that content and sequence were changed in 1999.

The majority of the professional course students came from foreign military organizations. These organizations generally had need for testing modifications to aircraft rather than testing of entirely new types of aircraft. As a consequence, avionics systems testing became more important and NTPS essentially broke the course into two major components - P&FQ testing, and avionic systems testing. A realization that one component did not, by itself, prepare students for the other component, a course flow was adopted that allowed students to take either half first, or to only take the half that was most relevant to the sponsoring organization. This school schedules avionic systems always in the first half of the year and P&FQ in the second half. With an introductory module preceding each six-month segment. students can join a year-long course either in January or July and carry through the entire course or simply stay for the chosen segment. A positive outcome of this approach is that every class has a combination of junior and senior students working together.

== Degrees ==
In 1995, the NTPS was approved by the State of California to award master's degrees in flight test and evaluation. Since 2004, graduates meeting all of the requirements have been eligible for an accredited Master of Science degree in flight test engineering. This degree is accredited by the Engineering Accreditation Commission of Accreditation Board for Engineering and Technology.

== Staff ==
The NTPS staff is highly experienced, both in flight testing and in instructing. About 15 full-time instructors and another 10 part-time, contract instructors are used. The typical instructor is a retired military officer, a graduate of a formal test pilot school, has a master's degree or higher, with over 15 years of flight test experience and 7+ years instructing experience with 5–10 years employment at the NTPS. Roughly half of the staff members are US citizens and half are international. The international backgrounds include Australia, Canada, France, Italy, Israel, South Africa, and the United Kingdom. As of 2025, the president and CEO of the school is Luca Campello. As of 2024, the chairman of the board of trustees is Patrick Garman.

== Aircraft ==
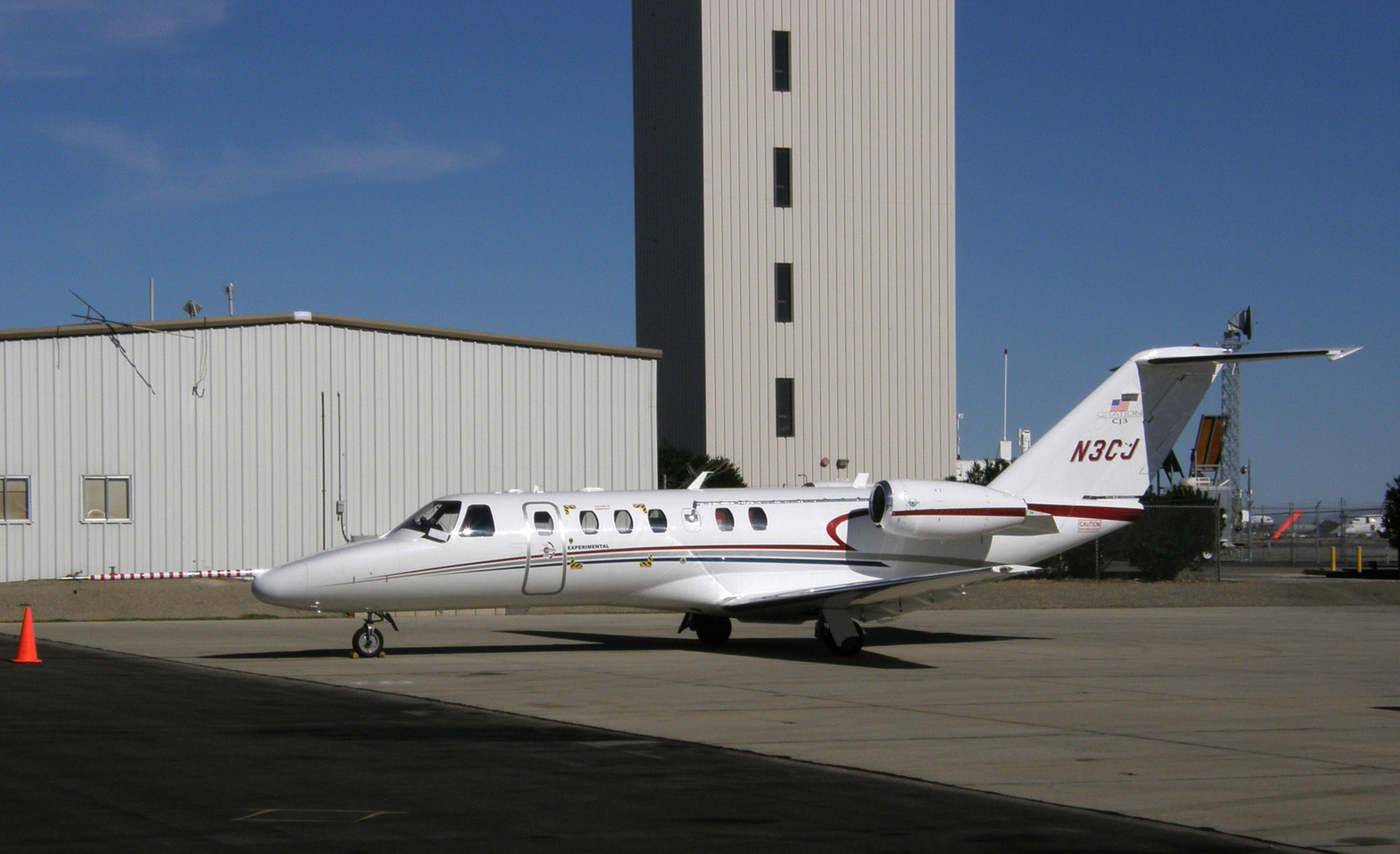
Cessna Citation CJ3 operated by the NTPS

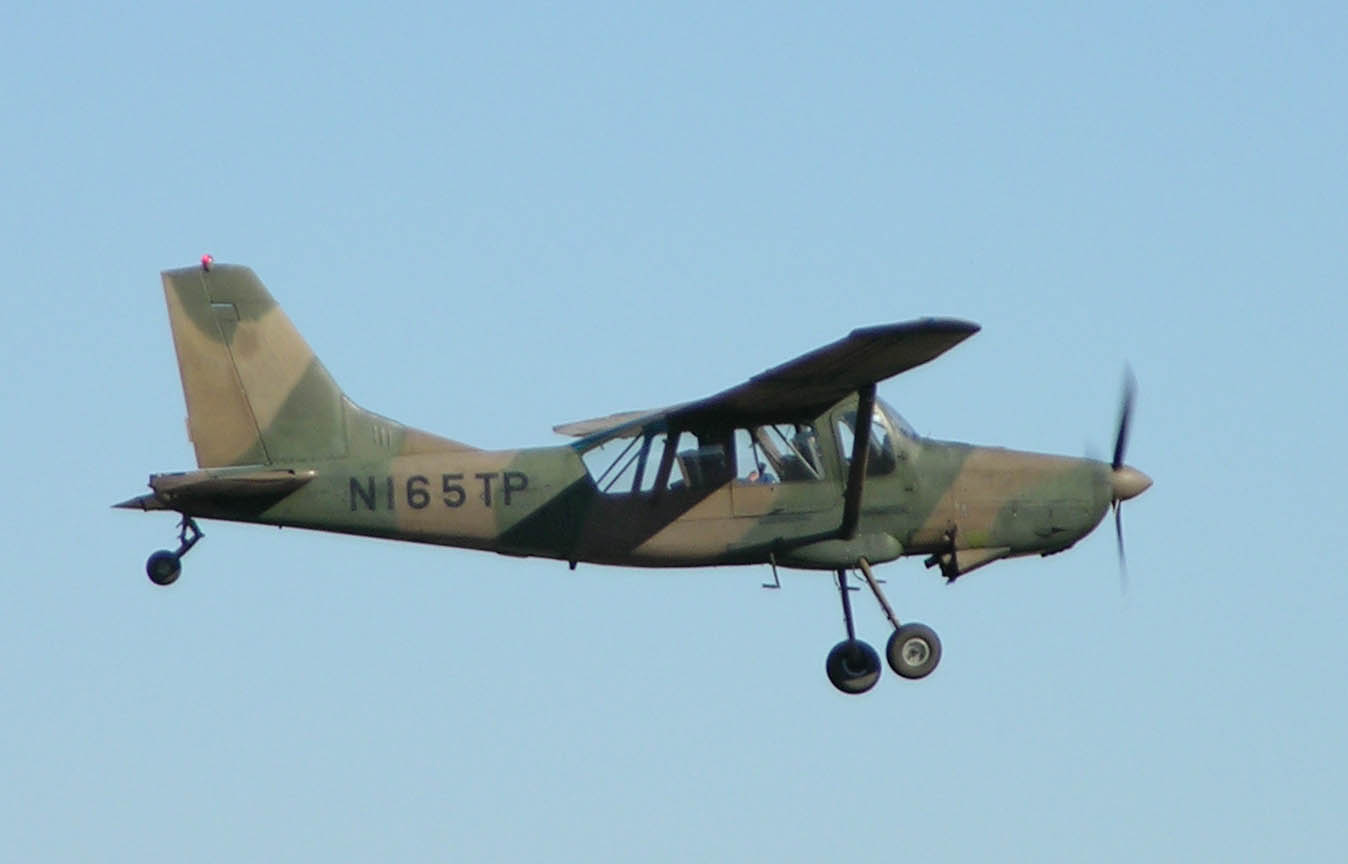
Aermacchi AM.3CM Bosbok that was operated by the NTPS

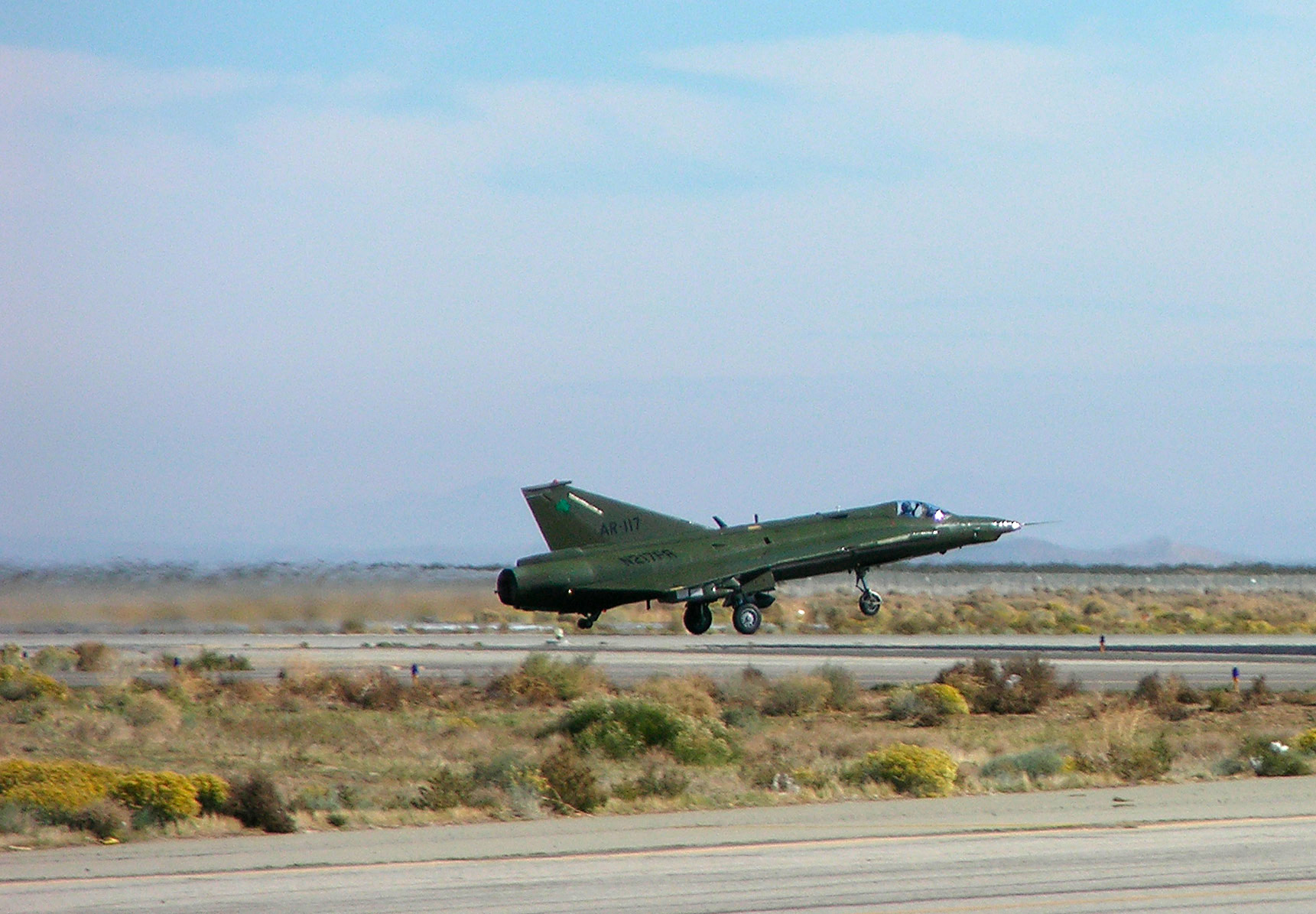
Saab Draken being operated by the NTPS, 2005

The NTPS routinely uses a fleet of approximately 34 aircraft (23 different types) located at the school's campus at the Mojave Air and Space Port in Mojave, California. The aircraft types are:

- Aero L-39 Albatross
- Aermacchi MB-326 Impala
- Beechcraft Duchess (BE-76)
- Airbus EC-145
- Augusta 109A
- Bell OH-58C Kiowa (retired in 2020)
- Bell UH-1N Twin Huey
- Cessna 150
- Cessna 172 Skyhawk
- Cessna 182 Skylane
- Beech C-90 King Air
- Cirrus SR22
- de Havilland DHC-1 Chipmunk
- Gippsland GA8 Airvan
- MBB BO-105
- Mig-21 Fishbed
- North American Sabreliner
- Northop T-38 Talon
- Piper PA-34 Seneca II
- Swearingen Merlin III

Additionally, the school leases other, outside aircraft as needed. Professional course student test pilots typically fly 24 different types of aircraft during their one-year program, including four one-time qualitative evaluations in nonschool aircraft after the PF&Q phase. All professional course students get a final project in an unfamiliar aircraft at the end of their course as a graduation exercise and capstone project for their master's degree.

== Students ==
Students who have attended the professional course or subsets of the full course at NTPS include pilots and engineers from more than 29 different organizations, including:

- Aerospace Industrial Development Corporation
- American Eurocopter
- Agusta
- Australian Army
- Belgian Ministry of Defence
- British Ministry of Defence
- Civil Aviation Administration of China
- Commercial Aircraft Corporation of China
- Dornier-Fairchild
- European Aeronautic Defence and Space Company (EADS)
- Eurocopter Group
- German Aerospace Center (DLR)
- German Military (BWB)
- Indonesian Aerospace
- Israeli Air Force
- Israeli Aircraft Industries
- Italian Air Force
- Korean Aerospace Industries
- Pilatus Aircraft Company
- Portuguese Air Force
- Republic of Korea Air Force
- Royal Australian Air Force
- Royal Canadian Air Force
- Royal Danish Air Force
- Royal Malaysian Air Force
- Royal Thai Air Force
- Sikorsky Aircraft Corporation
- Singapore Technologies Aerospace
- United Arab Emirates Presidential Guard Command

Students attending courses other than the professional course come from hundreds of different organizations, including:

1. Civil certification agencies worldwide (US FAA and civil aviation authorities from Argentina, Australia, Austria, Chile, China, Italy, Japan, the Netherlands, the Republic of Korea, and Switzerland)
2. Other governmental agencies (US Customs and Border Protection, Finnish Border Guards)
3. Aerospace manufacturers (Airbus, Beechcraft, Bell Helicopters, Bombardier, Cessna, Cirrus Aircraft, Embraer, Korean Aerospace Industries, Mitsubishi, Northop-Grumman)
4. US military organizations (Air Force, Navy, Army)

== See also ==
- List of test pilot schools
