= United States Naval Test Pilot School =

United States military school for test pilots

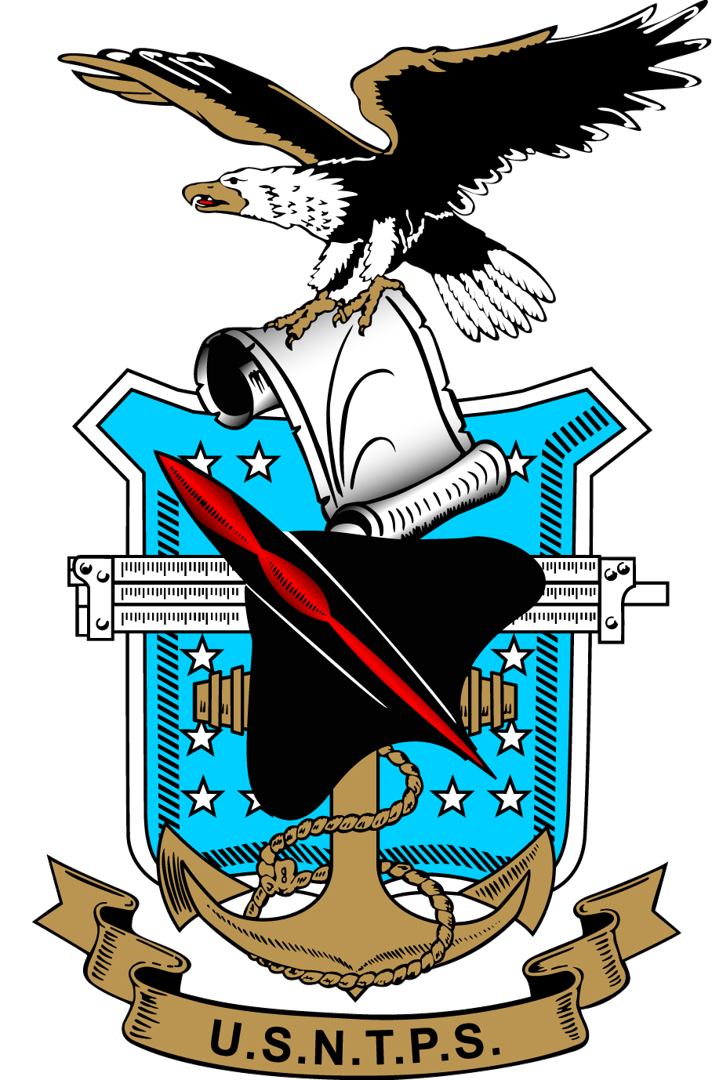
- United States Naval Test Pilot School patch
- Active: 1945 – present
- Country: United States
- Branch: United States Navy
- Type: Test pilot school
- Role: Training of test pilots and flight test engineers
- Part of: Naval Air Warfare Center
- Home station: Naval Air Station Patuxent River
- Nickname: USNTPS

The United States Naval Test Pilot School, located at Naval Air Station Patuxent River in Patuxent River, Maryland, provides instruction to experienced United States Navy, Marine Corps, Army, Air Force, and foreign military experimental test pilots, flight test engineers, and flight test flight officers in the processes and techniques of aircraft and systems testing and evaluation.

== History ==
The school was established in 1945, when the Navy's Flight Test Group transferred from Naval Air Station Anacostia, Washington, DC to Naval Air Station Patuxent River and Test Pilot Training Division or TPT was established.

It is the primary test pilot school for U.S. Army aviators, as it is the only U.S. military test pilot school to offer instruction on rotary-wing aircraft. They also operate an exchange program with the U.S. Air Force Test Pilot School located at Edwards Air Force Base. Class 1 graduated December 21, 1948. In 1957 the school's name was officially changed to the United States Naval Test Pilot School.

Milestones:

- Rotary Wing Syllabus introduced in 1961
- 11 month syllabus established in 1973
- Airborne Systems Syllabus introduced in 1975
- Short Course Department organised in 1997

== Training ==
The selection process is highly competitive, and applicants are chosen by a selection board. The curriculum accommodates three main specialities with two classes annually (11 months in duration):

- fixed wing (pilot/engineer)
- rotary wing (pilot/engineer)
- airborne systems (Naval flight officer/engineer)

Training program includes:

- pre-arrival flight training in T-6 (NAS Pensacola), T-38C (Randolph AFB), H-72, and H-60 (Western Army Aviation Training Site (WAATS), Marana, AZ)
- 530 academic hours
- 100 sorties/120 flight hours
- about 25 technical reports

Instructional flow is traditional theory to practice: classroom, lab and simulation, exercise briefing and flight demonstration, later data flights with technical reports preparation, review/debrief/critique.

Aircraft used by the United States Naval Test Pilot School include the T-6B Texan II, AT-6E Wolverine, T-38C Talon, UH-72A Lakota, UH-60L Blackhawk, C-26A ASTARS III, F/A-18F Super Hornet, C-12C Huron, NU-1B Otter, OH-58C Kiowa, U-6A Beaver, and the X-26A Frigate. The school also temporarily operates a TB-25N Mitchell "Panchito", a CT-133 Silver Star of Ace Maker Aviation, a AH-1F Huey Cobra of Army Aviation Heritage Foundation and a Learjet 25 of Calspan Corporation, all used briefly at different times by the school.

== Notable alumni ==
Those include (by year/class of graduation):

- Marion E. Carl (1945, Class "O")
- Edward "Whitey" Feightner (1949, Class 2)
- George Chamberlain Duncan (1949, Class 3)
- Alan Shepard (1951, Class 5)
- Bob Hoover (Class 6, also USAF TPS Class 1946c)
- John Glenn (1954, Class 12)
- Thomas B. Hayward (1954, Class 12)
- James Bond Stockdale (1954, Class 12)
- Scott Carpenter (1954, Class 13)
- Richard Gordon (Class 19)
- Jim Lovell (1958, Class 20)
- Wally Schirra (1958, Class 20)
- Pete Conrad (1958, Class 20)
- John Young (1959, Class 23)
- Alan Bean (Class 26)
- Richard G. Thomas (Class 31)
- Vance D. Brand (Class 33)
- Frederick Gregory (Class 58)
- Charles Bolden (former NASA Administrator and former Space Shuttle Commander) (Class 75)
- Pierre Thuot (Class 83)
- William "Willie" McCool (Class 101)
- Mark Kelly (Class 105)
- Scott Kelly (Class 105)
- Sunita Williams (1993, Class 104)
- Stephen S. Oswald (Class 74)
- Paul Sohl (Class 104)
- Art "Turbo" Tomassetti (1997, Class 112)
- Reid Wiseman (Class 125)
- Anne McClain (Class 143)

== See also ==
- List of test pilot schools
