= Arseny Mironov =

Russian scientist, aerospace engineer and aviator

Dr. Arseny Mironov
- Арсений Миронов
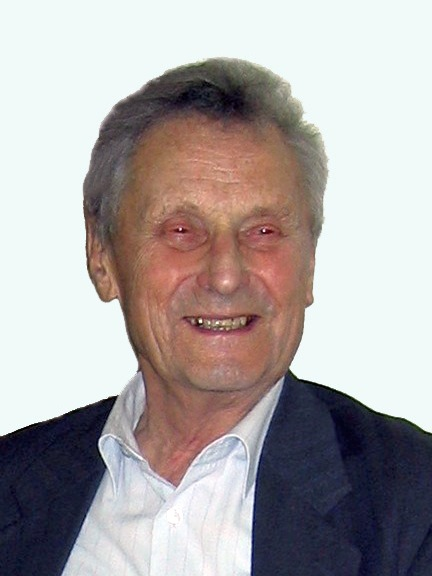
- Mironov in 2007
- Born: 25 December 1917; Vladimir, RSFSR
- Died: 3 July 2019 (aged 101); Zhukovsky, Moscow Oblast, Russia
- Education: Moscow Aviation Institute (1941)
- Occupations: scientist; engineer; aircraft pilot
- Years active: 1941–2019
- Employer: Gromov Flight Research Institute (1941–2019)
- Known for: scientist in aircraft aerodynamics and flight testing, 8th director of the Gromov Flight Research Institute (1981–1985)
- Title: Doctor of Science; Professor
- Spouse: Olga E. Rudneva (m. 1940; died 2017)
- Children: 2
- Awards: Stalin Prize (1948); USSR State Prize (1976)
- Website: web.archive.org/web/20191209063851/http://lii.ru/novosti/100-letniy-yubiley-mironova-arseniya-dmitrievicha/ (in Russian)

Signature
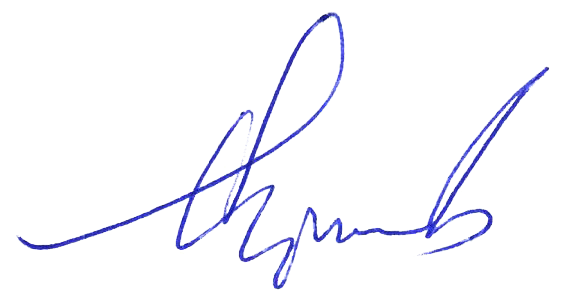

Arseny Dmitrievich Mironov (Russian: Арсений Дмитриевич Миронов; 25 December 1917 – 3 July 2019) was a Russian scientist, aerospace engineer, and aviator. He was one of the oldest researchers in aircraft aerodynamics and flight testing, a Gromov Flight Research Institute (GFRI) director from 1981 to 1985, a recipient of the Stalin Prize in 1948 and the USSR State Prize in 1976, and an honorary citizen of Zhukovsky.

Mironov contributed to aviation engineering and research through the GFRI, serving as a flight test engineer, researcher, and director. He turned 100 in December 2017.

== Early life ==
Mironov was born in Vladimir. His father was Dmitry Ivanovich Mironov (Russian: Дмитрий Иванович Миронов; 1884–1956), an engineer-electrician who worked for Klasson hydroelectric power station in Moscow Oblast and later for electric company Mosenergo in Moscow. His mother Maria Mikhailovna Ilyicheva (Russian: Мария Михайловна Ильичёва; 1889–1982) was a housewife.

Two years after leaving school, Mironov worked as a factory electrician.

== Career ==
=== Early years ===
In 1936, Mironov entered the Moscow Aviation Institute (MAI) at a new course Flight Testing and graduated in 1941. In May 1941, he started working for the Gromov Flight Research Institute (GFRI) within the Minaviaprom of the USSR.

=== Scientific career ===
In the GFRI, Mironov primarily did engineering and research. He started as a flight test engineer just three days before the beginning of the Great Patriotic War. During the war, he participated in the serial production of fighter planes, which included flight and ground testing (to eliminate quality defects in the aircraft's flying and fighting capabilities) conducted by the GFRI and aircraft manufacturers.

Post-war, Mironov developed methods for aerodynamic research using free-flying models, making a breakthrough in collecting in-flight data concerning wing profile pressure distribution at transonic speeds. As a lead scientist, he organized the GFRI's flight research in aeroplanes' physical aerodynamics and associated environment effects, including the sonic boom impact of supersonic aeroplanes.

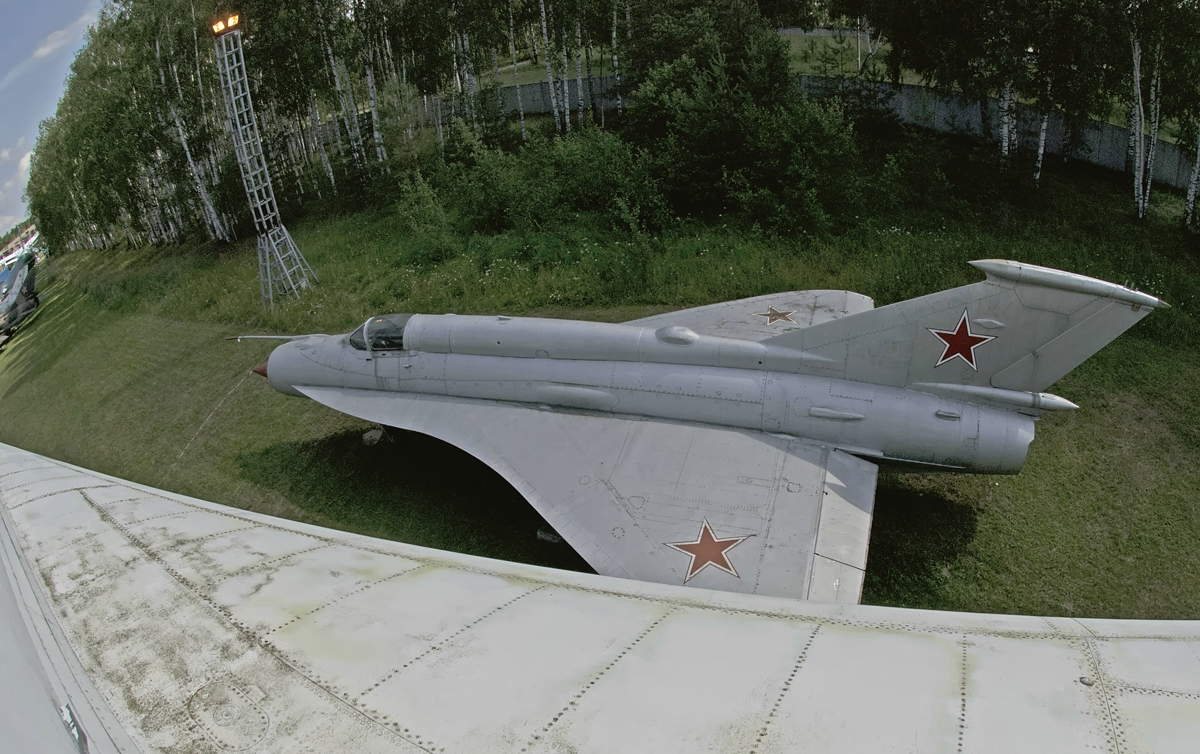
MiG-21I Imitator, a testbed for testing the concept of the Tu-144's wing

In 1968-1975, Mironov together with V. S. Grachev conducted flight studies of the aerodynamic characteristics of an experimental ogival delta wing designed for the then developing supersonic airliner Tupolev Tu-144. These studies were conducted at the GFRI on one of the two specially created testbed aeroplanes MiG-21I (I - from the imitator). The research flights were performed by Igor Volk, Oleg Gudkov and Vladislav Loychikov.

Mironov participated in the development and implementation of the Aircraft Testing Handbooks, a series of official guides for the flight and ground testing of military aircraft. He played a major role in the USSR's communication with the International Civil Aviation Organization in the development of aircraft type certification and noise regulation, especially for supersonic transport aeroplanes.

As a member of investigation commissions, Mironov was closely involved in the investigation of aviation accidents, including the March 1968 MiG-15 training flight accident involving Yuri Gagarin and Vladimir Seryogin, the 1972 Il-62 airliner crash near Nerskoye Lake, and others. Regarding the MiG-15 training flight accident, Mironov developed and publicly supported a scientifically-grounded position against numerous different explanations and conspiracies.

Mironov became the head of the GFRI's research division. He then worked as a deputy to Victor Utkin, who was the institute's chief from 1969 to 1974. Later, Mironov became his first deputy after veteran Max Taitz. When Utkin died in 1981, Mironov became the institute's chief (1982), serving until Konstantin Vasilchenko was appointed in 1985. From 1981 to 1985, Mironov was a head of the Aerophysical and Flight Research Department within the Aeromechanics and Flight Engineering Faculty of the Moscow Institute of Physics and Technology.

From 1996 to 2019, Mironov worked for the GFRI as a principal researcher in human factors and aviation safety.

=== Flight career ===
Since childhood, Mironov was interested in aviation and aircraft modelling. While studying in the MAI, he completed the initial flight training course at MAI's aero-club with a U-2 pilot license. He later completed gliding flight training and made several parachute jumps.

In a group of students visiting the GFRI, Mironov met with then-chief Mikhail Gromov and explained his plans to be a test pilot, to which Gromov responded, "Will see". Since his early days in the institute, Mironov was involved in aircraft flight testing as a test engineer, navigator, and transport pilot. On 4 October 1943, an accident occurred in the La-5 aircraft's test flight with Mironov in the flight crew—a mid-air collision with air defence patrol fighter Yak-1, whose pilot violated normal procedure flying too close to a test aeroplane. Mironov was severely wounded and spent five months in a hospital. Lasting issues in his left elbow hindered Mironov's ability to train and apply for a test pilot position. However, he passed the check flight with the institute's senior test pilot, proving he could fly light transport aeroplanes such as the Po-2. After the incident, Mironov frequently piloted aircraft, including the Po-2 and the Yakovlev UT-1. He completed hundreds of transport flights and obtained a USSR fourth class air transport pilot license. Until 1950, he was also involved in test flights as navigator and flight test engineer on aircraft such as the Il-2, Pe-8, Tu-2, and Yak-9.

Mironov's flight training in gliding started before the war in Chkalov Central Aero-club in Moscow under the supervision of Sergei Anokhin. Mironov's flight instructor was Margarita Ratsenskaya, the aero-club's gliding squad commander and Anokhin's wife. Due to a mutual interest in gliding, Mironov became closely acquainted with Oleg Antonov and frequently piloted the Antonov A-15 glider.

== Family ==
Mironov was married to Olga Yevgenevna Rudneva (Russian: Ольга Евгеньевна Руднева; 1919–2017) for 77 years. Rudneva studied in the same class in the MAI with her future husband. She worked at Kazan Aviation Plant and for the GFRI as a lead flight test engineer.

The couple had two children. Their son, Mikhail Mironov (Russian: Михаил Арсеньевич Миронов; born 1944), is a Doctor of Physics and Math and an acoustic scientist working for the Andreyev Acoustics Institute. Their daughter, Olga Maksakova (Mironova) (Russian: Ольга Арсеньевна Максакова (Миронова); born 1946) is a psychotherapy practitioner and a Doctor of Medicine working for the Burdenko Neurosurgery National Research Center.

There are also two grandsons and one granddaughter.

== Awards ==
- Stalin Prize (1948) for development and implementation of a new method for aerodynamics research.
- USSR State Prize (1976) for flight testing and introduction into service the Su-24 tactical bomber.
- Order of Lenin (1971).
- Order of the Red Banner of Labour (1957).
- Order of the Badge of Honour (1966).
- Jubilee Medal "In Commemoration of the 100th Anniversary of the Birth of Vladimir Ilyich Lenin" (1970).
- Jubilee Medal "Thirty Years of Victory in the Great Patriotic War 1941–1945" (1975).
- Medal "Veteran of Labour" (1985).
- Honoured Aircraft Engineer.
- Master of Sport of the USSR in gliding.
- Zhukovsky Honorary Citizen.
- Gromov Medal: highest corporate award of the GFRI (2011).

On his 100th birthday ceremony on 25 December 2017, Mironov was awarded a Chest Badge "Medal of Small Arms Maker M.T. Kalashnikov" by the Russian Ministry of Industry and Trade.

== Memorials ==
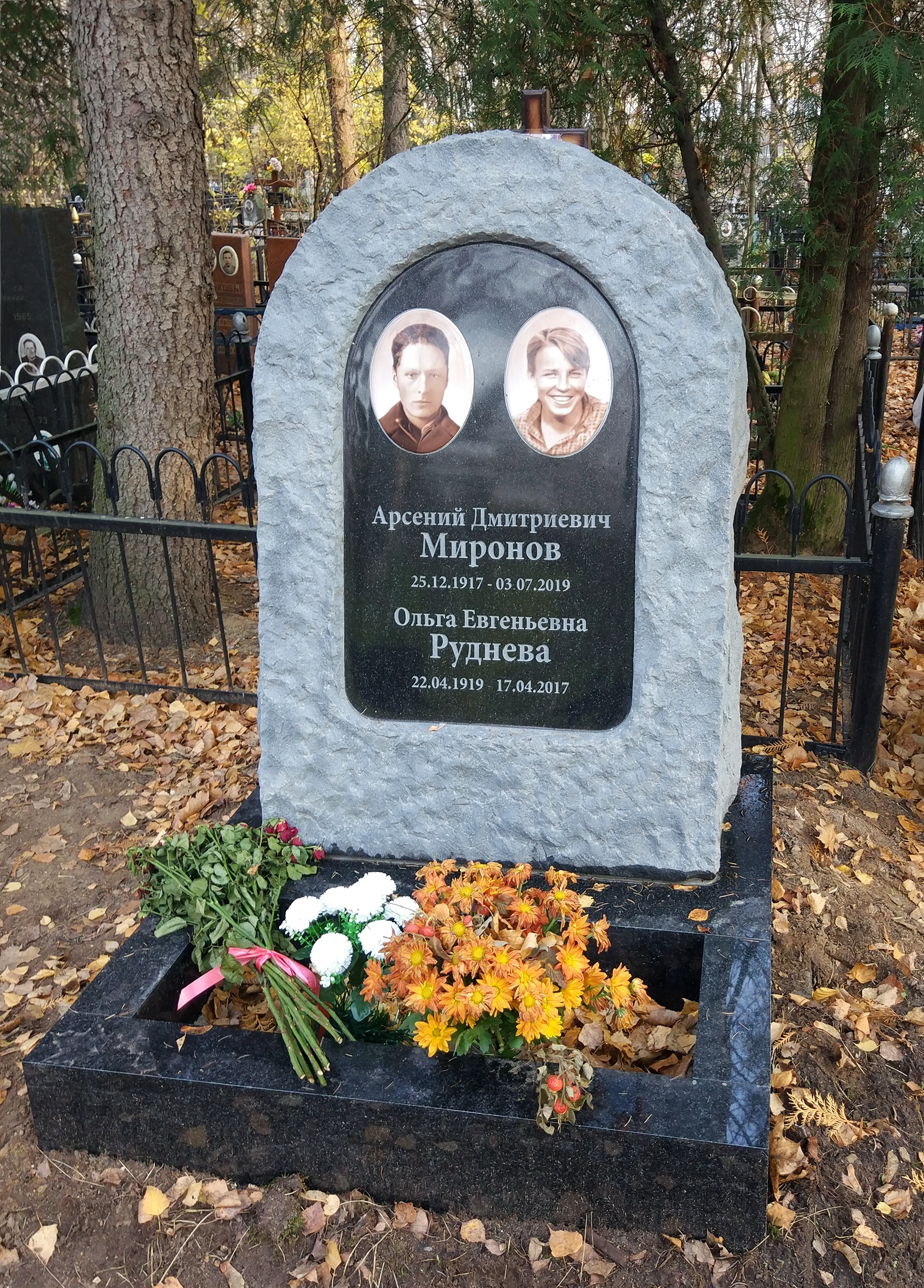
Family grave of Arseny Mironov and his wife Olga Rudneva

Mironov is buried together with his wife Olga at the Bykovskoe Cemetery in Zhukovsky.

== Bibliography ==
Between the early 1980s and mid-1990s, as a chief editor and author, Mironov contributed to the book series Aviation Test Engineer Reference Bibliotheca, which consist of ten and a half monographs on different research and methodical aspects of aircraft flight testing. Mironov's major contributions include the following books:

- Миронов, А. Д.; Лапин, А. А.; Меерович, Г. Ш.; Зайцев, Ю. И. (1982). Миронов, Арсений (ed.). Задачи и структура летных испытаний самолетов и вертолетов [Objectives and Framework of the Aeroplanes and Helicopters Flight Tests]. Справочная библиотека авиационного инженера-испытателя "Летные испытания самолетов и вертолетов" (in Russian). Москва: Машиностроение. p. 144.
- Миронов, А. Д.; Королёв, А. А.; Замятин, А. Н.; Роднов, А. В.; Фомин, М. Г. (1985). Методы аэрофизических исследований в полёте [Methods of Aerophysics Flight Research]. Справочная библиотека авиационного инженера-испытателя "Летные испытания самолетов и вертолетов" (in Russian). Москва: Машиностроение. p. 112.
- Миронов, А. Д.; и др. (1988). Методы исследования на летающих моделях [Methods for Research on Flying Models]. Справочная библиотека авиационного инженера-испытателя "Летные испытания самолетов и вертолетов" (in Russian). Москва: Машиностроение. p. 143. ISBN 9785217003037.

As an author and consulting editor, Mironov contributed in the academic publication, Свищёв, Георгий, ed. (1994). Авиация : Энциклопедия [Aviation : Encyclopaedia] (in Russian). Москва: Большая российская энциклопедия : TsAGI. p. 735.

Mironov's other publications include:

- Mironov's publications in the international online catalogue WorldCat
- Брен, С. Б.; Миронов, А. Д.; Уткин, В. В. (1948). "Методика аэродинамических исследований на крылатой бомбе ЛИИ" [Method of aerodynamic research using LII winged-bomb]. Труды ЛИИ (in Russian) (6). ЛИИ.
- Остославский, И. В.; Миронов, А. Д.; Строев, Н. С.; Уткин, В. В. (1950). "Аэродинамические исследования больших скоростей при помощи летающих моделей" [High speeds aerodynamic studies using the flying models]. Труды ЛИИ (in Russian) (10). ЛИИ.
- Миронов, А. Д. (1952). "Обтекание крыловых профилей при околозвуковых скоростях" [Flow over the wing profiles at transonic speeds]. Труды ЛИИ (in Russian) (16). ЛИИ.
- Остославский, И. В.; Миронов, А. Д.; Кириллов, Е. А. (1956). "О влиянии самолёта, летящего со сверхзвуковой скоростью, на окружающее пространство" [On the influence of an aeroplane flying with supersonic speed on the surrounding space]. Техника воздушного флота (in Russian) (5). ЦАГИ. ISSN 0868-8060.
- Миронов, А. Д.; Кириллов, Е. А.; Колушев, М. А. (1961). "Ударные волны и маршруты полётов" [Shock waves and the flight routes]. Научно-технический сборник ЛИИ (in Russian). ЛИИ.
- Миронов, А. Д. (1964). Сверхзвуковой "хлопок" самолета [Supersonic "swat" of an aeroplane] (in Russian). Москва: Воениздат. p. 51.
- Миронов, А. Д.; Строев, Н. С.; Тайц, М. А.; и др. (1980). Образцов, И. Ф. (ed.). Развитие авиационной науки и техники в СССР: историко-технические очерки - Глава "Лётные исследования" [Development of aviation science and technology in the USSR: historical and technical essays - Chapter "Flight research"] (in Russian). Москва: Наука : АН СССР. p. 496.
- Миронов, А. Д.; Фомин, М. Г. (1982). "Лётные исследования шума, создаваемого пассажирскими самолётами на местности" [Flight research of a noise generated on the terrain by the passenger aeroplanes]. Труды ЦАГИ (in Russian). 42 (2185). ЦАГИ.
- Krilyk, Igor; Mironov, Arseny (1990). "On the crew error probability approach to evaluating flight safety". Proceedings of the 42nd IASS. Annual International Flight Safety Seminar (IASS). Flight Safety Foundation. pp. 177–178.
- Васильченко, К. К.; Знаменская, А. М.; Клячко, М. Д.; Махонькин, Ю. Е.; Миронов, А. Д.; Хейфец, М. И., eds. (1993). Лётные исследования и испытания. Фрагменты истории и современное состояние : Научно-технический сборник [Flight Research and Testing. Fragments of History and the Present State: A Sci.-Tech. Collection] (in Russian). Москва: Машиностроение. p. 496. ISBN 9785217020591.
- Близнюк, В.; Васильев, Л.; Вуль, В.; Климов, В.; Миронов, А.; и др. (2000). Климов, Валентин (ed.). Правда о сверхзвуковых пассажирских самолётах [The truth about supersonic passenger aeroplanes] (in Russian). Москва: Московский рабочий. p. 335.
- Миронов, А. Д.; Берестов, Л. М.; Золотухин, Р. Б.; Леонова, М. Ф.; Амирьянц, В. А., eds. (2001). Лётно-исследовательский институт. События. Люди [Flight Research Institute. Events. People] (in Russian). Москва: Машиностроение : Машиностроение-Полет. p. 536.
- Миронов, Арсений; Селивёрстова, Нина (January 2003). Ошибка, величина которой неизвестна [Error which value is unknown]. Авиаглобус (in Russian). No. 1. Москва: ООО "АВИАГЛОБУС". pp. 32–33.
- Миронов, А. Д.; Петров, А. Н.; Костюк, А. И. (2007). "Безопасность полета и язык эксплуатационной документации" [Flight Safety and a Language of the Operating and Maintenance Documentation]. Полет (in Russian) (11). Машиностроение-Полет: 50–55. ISSN 1684-1301.
- Миронов, Арсений; Полтавец, Владимир; Бирюков, Владимир (2010). Три катастрофы - вывод один "человеческий фактор" или "человеческие факторы"? [Three disasters - the conclusion is one "human factor" or "human factors"?]. Гражданская авиация (in Russian). No. 2. Москва: ООО "Редакция журнала "Гражданская авиация". pp. 39–43. ISSN 0017-3606.
- Mironov, Arseny; Nakvasin, Andrey (2014). "Development and flight research of non-intrusive airborne system of pilot psychophysiological status monitoring" (PDF). Proceedings of the 29th Congress of the International Council of the Aeronautical Sciences. 29th Annual Congress ICAS 2014. St. Petersburg, Russia: International Council of the Aeronautical Sciences. pp. 1–9.
- RU 2091057, Mironov, Arsenij D.; Loginov, Oleg E. & Tsvetkov, Boris Yu. et al., "СПОСОБ НЕПРЕРЫВНОГОО КОНТРОЛЯ ПСИХОФИЗИОЛОГИЧЕСКОГО СОСТОЯНИЯ ОПЕРАТОРА В ПРОЦЕССЕ УПРАВЛЕНИЯ ОБЪЕКТОМ И СИСТЕМА ДЛЯ ЕГО ОСУЩЕСТВЛЕНИЯ [Method for continuous monitoring of the operator's psychophysiological state in process of moving object management and the system intended for its implementation]", published 1997-09-27
- RU 2319115, Mironov, Arseny Dmitrievich; Yunisov, Ramil Rashidovich & Ivanov, Mikhail Timofeevich, "СПОСОБ ОПРЕДЕЛЕНИЯ ВЕСА И ПОЛОЖЕНИЯ ЦЕНТРА ТЯЖЕСТИ САМОЛЕТА [Method for determining the weight and position the centre of gravity of an aircraft]", published 2008-03-10, assigned to M. M. Gromov Flight Research Institute
- RU 2458201, Mironov, Arseniy Dmitrievich; Vid, Vilhelm Imanuilovich & Rodnov, Anatoly Vasilievich et al., "СПОСОБ ВЫЗОВА СБРОСА СНЕЖНЫХ ЛАВИН [Method to cause triggering of snow avalanches]", published 2012-08-10, assigned to M. M. Gromov Flight Research Institute
- RU 2442945, Mironov, Arseniy Dmitrievich; Vid, Vilhelm Imanuilovich & Zavershnev, Yuri Alexandrovich et al., "СПОСОБ РАЗМИНИРОВАНИЯ МИННЫХ ПОЛЕЙ ЗВУКОВЫМ УДАРОМ [Method for clearing minefields with a sonic boom]", published 2012-02-20, assigned to M. M. Gromov Flight Research Institute

In 2017, Mironov published a short autobiography: Миронов, Арсений (2017). Эпизоды [Episodes] (in Russian). Жуковский: АО «ЛИИ им. М.М. Громова».
