= Max Taitz =

Soviet scientist and engineer (1904–1980)

Dr. Max Taitz
- Макс Тайц
- Born: 21 January 1904; Warsaw, Russian Empire
- Died: 23 July 1980 (aged 76); Zhukovsky
- Burial place: Bykovskoye Memorial Cemetery in Zhukovsky
- Citizenship: Soviet Union
- Education: Bauman Moscow Higher Technical School (1929)
- Occupations: Scientist; Engineer
- Years active: 1929–1974
- Employers: Central Aerohydrodynamic Institute; Flight Research Institute
- Known for: Scientist in aerodynamics; theory of jet engines and flight testing of aircraft; a founder of the Gromov Flight Research Institute (1941)
- Title: Deputy Chief of the Gromov Flight Research Institute Doctor of Engineering Professor
- Successor: Arseny Mironov
- Spouse: Iraida B. Zeest (married 1925)
- Children: 2
- Awards: Stalin Prize (1949 and 1953)
- Website: old.lii.ru/tajts_maks_arkad_evich.html (in Russian)

Signature
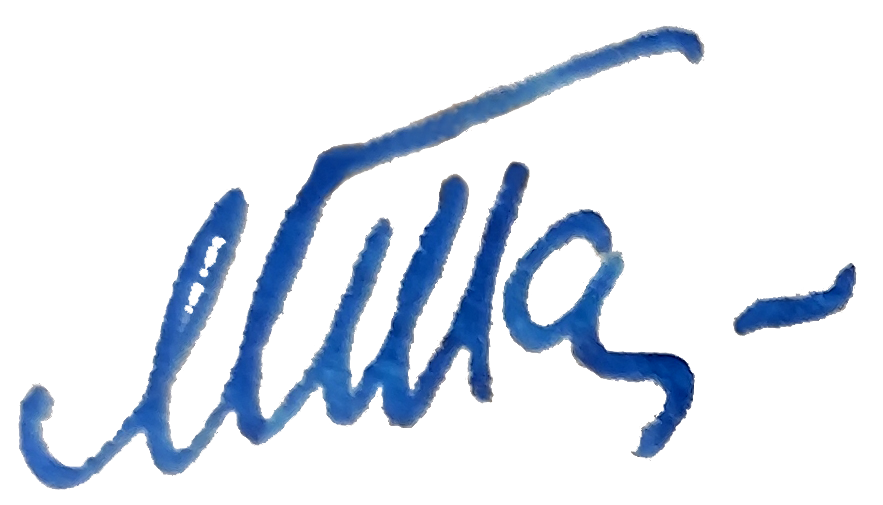

Max Taitz (Max Arkadyevich Taitz, Russian: Макс Аркадьевич Тайц; 1904–1980) was a Soviet scientist, engineer, and one of the founders of Gromov Flight Research Institute (1941). He was a doctor of engineering, a professor, and a recipient of the Stalin Prize (1949 and 1953), and the honorary title of Honoured Scientist of the RSFSR (1961).

== Biography ==
=== Early years ===
Taitz was born in Warsaw, Russian Empire. In 1915, the Taitz family escaped from the war to Moscow, where he and his younger brother studied at the Sokolov-Korobov private gymnasium (later Soviet secondary school No. 81). After leaving the gymnasium, he entered Bauman Moscow Higher Technical School. While he was a student, Taitz worked as a proofreader and a binder for a number of Moscow publishers. Closer to graduation, he worked as an aviation technician for the Soviet Air Force Research Institute (NII VVS) and began flight training in Sevastopol. In 1925, Taitz married Moscow State University student Iraida Zeest, who later became an archaeologist. Upon graduation from the Bauman Moscow Higher Technical School in 1929, he was assigned to work for the Central Aerohydrodynamic Institute (TsAGI).

=== Central Aerohydrodynamic Institute (TsAGI) ===
Taitz started work as a flight test engineer in the flight test section of the TsAGI under the supervision of Alexander Chesalov and Vsevolod Vedrov. His first job was flight testing of the TB-5 heavy bomber with Mikhail Gromov as a lead test pilot.

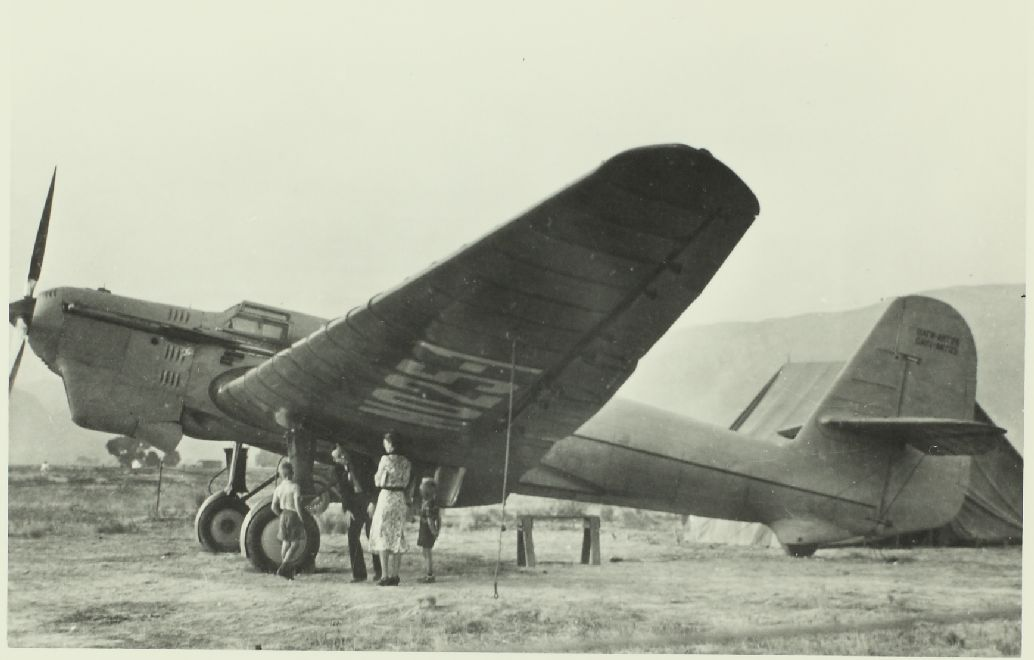
ANT-25 in San Jacinto after the new non-stop flight distance record of 10,148 kilometers (6,306 mi) from Moscow to United States via the North Pole (July 1937)

From 1934 to 1937, Taitz participated in a technical commission for engineering support of non-stop flight distance record flights of Valery Chkalov and Mikhail Gromov in the Tupolev ANT-25 long-haul aeroplane and upon successful completion was awarded his first Order of Red Banner of Labour (1937). He was one of the authors of the comprehensive "Aircraft designer reference book" published by TsAGI in 1937. He was also involved in engineering support of Sigizmund Levanevsky's record flights from Moscow over the North Pole to the US.

After the arrest of his elder brother David Taitz in the Great Purge in 1938, Taitz left TsAGI and worked as engineer-editor for the State Scientific Library of the NKTP, editing the aviation department of the News of Technical Literature journal. In 1939, he got a chance to obtain the position of Dean of Theoretical Mechanics Department at the Soviet Union Industrial Academy but in 1940, a delegation from TsAGI visited him and requested his return to the institute to head a group of researchers.

=== Flight Research Institute ===
Together with Alexander Chesalov and Vsevolod Vedrov, and with the support of Mikhail Gromov and Ivan Petrov, Taitz arranged the establishment of the Institute of Flight Research (8 March 1941). In the new institute Taitz held the Chief of Laboratory No. 2 position and also acted as the institute Deputy Chief for science. During the Great Patriotic War (World War II), Taitz headed the evacuation of the science core of the institute to Novosibirsk, and supervised flight and ground testing of the serial production fighter aeroplanes to eliminate defects in the flight qualities and war-fighting capabilities of the aircraft. At the same time he took the lead in developing the second volume of the Aircraft Designers Handbook (RDK) devoted to flight test techniques and published by TsAGI in 1944. The same year Taitz was assigned to head a Soviet technical group for the evaluation of the Peenemünde test site where the German V-1 and V-2 missiles were tested.

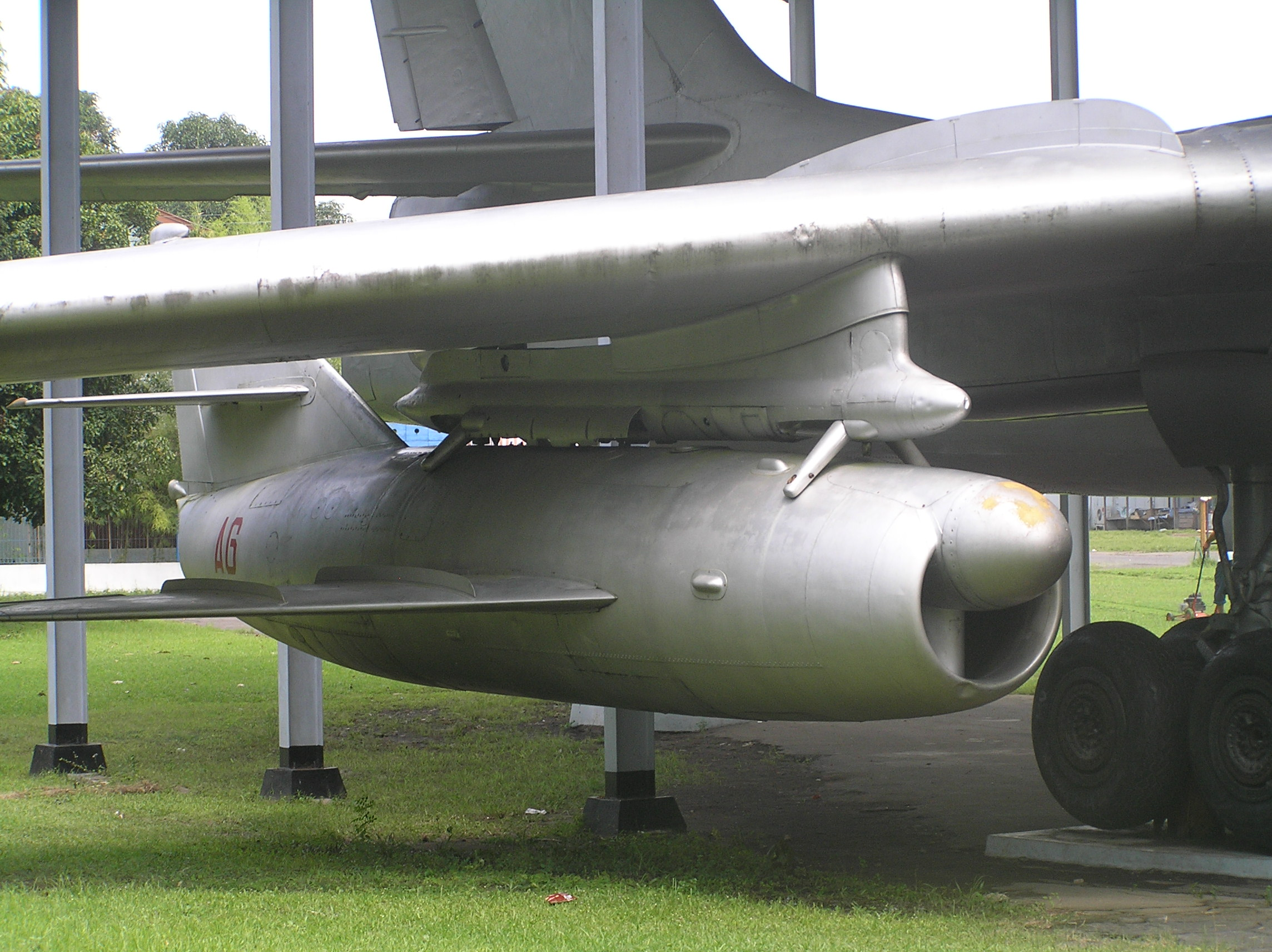
Cruise missile KS-1 under the wing of Tu-16 bomber

From 1945 to 1947, together with Alexander Chesalov, Taitz initiated the development of testbed aeroplanes based on the Tu-2 bomber for flight testing of the jet engines. Concurrently he developed the theory of similarity for aviation turbojet engine testing. Taitz organised and supervised the flight research and testing of the first Soviet jet fighters MiG-9, MiG-15, MiG-19 and Su-9, for which he was awarded the Stalin Prize in 1949.

At the end of 1940s during a second wave of antisemitism, Taitz and many others were fired from the institute. Later, in conjunction with new research projects in unmanned aircraft and missiles, and the establishment in 1952 of a new dedicated division, he was asked to return to the institute. After his return, he played a major role in the development and flight tests of Soviet cruise missiles the KS-1 and others, and their automatic control systems. In 1956, chief of the institute Nikolai Stroev, insisted Taitz be assigned his deputy, although a number of high-level officials of the aviation industry were against that due to Taitz's Jewish ethnicity, his reluctance to be a Communist Party member and his repressed or emigrated relatives.

In the late 1960s, Taitz initiated the development of the USSR civil aircraft certification system and was a strong supporter of joining the USSR to the Chicago convention and ICAO. Gromov Flight Research Institute became a leading research organisation in the USSR in flight testing and certification of aircraft and Taitz was a driving force behind that. Other notable scientists in these activities were Nikolai Stroev, Victor Utkin, and Arseny Mironov. For a number of years in the 1960s, Taitz was head of the Soviet-French working group on avionics and flight tests. He was awarded the Order of Lenin in 1966 for achievements in automation of aeroplane controls.

=== Universities ===
At different times Taitz was a professor at the Moscow Aviation Institute, Moscow State Aviation Technological University (1940–1941) and Moscow Institute of Physics and Technology (1938–1940 and 1955–1980). From 1965 to 1974 he was head of the Aerophysical and Flight Research Department within the Aeromechanics and Flight Engineering Faculty of the Moscow Institute of Physics and Technology.

=== Family ===
Taitz was born to Izhok-Aaron (Isaac-Arkady) Z. Taitz (Russian: Ицхок-Аарон (Исаак-Аркадий) Захарович Тайц) (1868–1935), a travelling salesman who was born in Kaunas, Lithuania, Russian Empire, and Sara (Sophia) M. Vilenchuk (Russian: Сара Мовшевна (Софья Моисеевна) Виленчук) (1874–1951), who was born in a suburb of Kaunas.

In 1925 Taitz married Iraida B. Zeest (Russian: Ираида Борисовна Зеест) (1902–1981), who was born in Saint Petersburg. She studied at Moscow State University and graduated from the Faculty of Philology, with a Doctor of Science in History degree. She worked for the Pushkin State Museum of Fine Arts and later for the Institute of Archaeology, USSR Academy of Sciences. They had two daughters; Irina M. Khmelevskaya Taitz (Russian: Ирина Максовна Хмелевская Тайц) (born 1932) and Elena M. Flokovskaya Taitz (Russian: Елена Максовна Флорковская Тайц) (born 1940).

== Awards and decorations ==
- Stalin Prize (1949) for flight research and testing of the first Soviet jet fighters
- Stalin Prize (1953) for flight testing and introduction into service of the first Soviet cruise missiles (particularly KS-1 Komet)
- Order of Lenin (in 1944 and 1966)
- Order of the October Revolution
- Order of the Patriotic War 1st Class (1945)
- Three Orders of the Red Banner of Labour (the first one in 1937 for engineering support of the non-stop flight distance record flights of Valery Chkalov and Mikhail Gromov)
- Jubilee Medal "In Commemoration of the 100th Anniversary of the Birth of Vladimir Ilyich Lenin" (1970)
- Medal "For the Defence of Moscow" (1944)
- Medal "Veteran of Labour"
- Gold medal of VDNKh (1977)

== Memorials ==
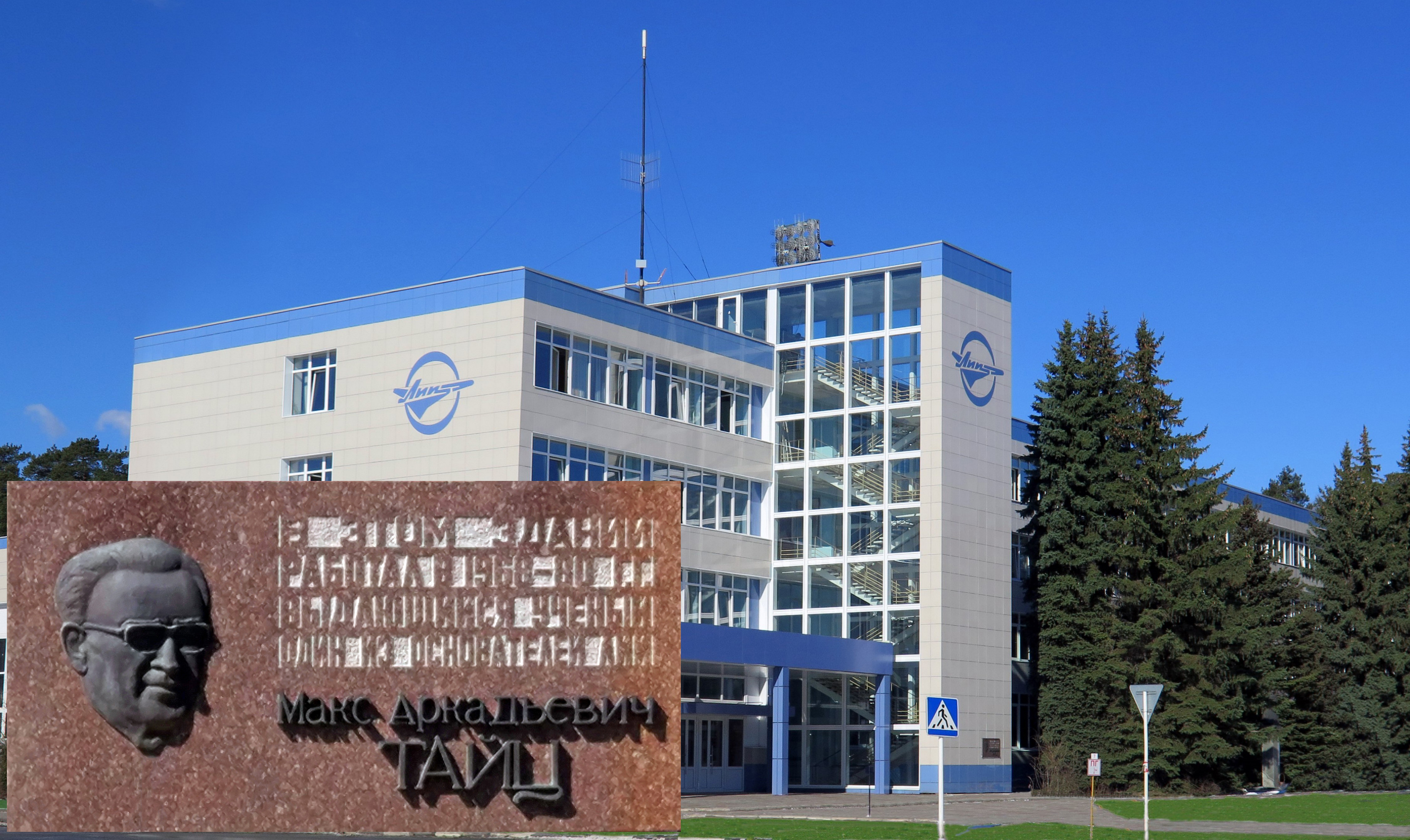
Max Taitz memorial plate on the Gromov Flight Research Institute headquarters building

Taitz is buried at the Bykovskoye Memorial Cemetery in Zhukovsky. There is a bronze memorial plate with his bas-relief image installed on the Gromov Flight Research Institute headquarters building where he once worked.

== Notable publications ==
Most of Taitz's notable publications are in Russian.

- Ведров, В. С.; Горский, В. П.; Тайц, М. А. (1935). "Сравнение результатов исследований 5 самолетов в полете и их моделей в аэродинамических трубах" [Comparison of results of 5 aeroplanes in-flight research and their models testing in the wind tunnels]. Труды ЦАГИ (in Russian) (214). ЦАГИ.
- Справочник авиаконструктора [Aircraft designer reference book] (in Russian). Москва: ЦАГИ. 1937. p. 512.
- Калачев, Г. С.; Остославский, И. В.; Тайц, М. А. (1945). "Некоторые вопросы компоновки скоростных самолетов" [Certain problems of high-speed aeroplanes configuration]. Труды ЛИИ (in Russian). ЛИИ.
- Ведров, В. С.; Тайц, М. А. (1951). Летные испытания самолетов [Aeroplanes flight testing] (in Russian). Москва: Оборонгиз. p. 484.
- Ведров, В. С.; Смирнов, В. П.; Тайц, М. А. (1956). "Исследования продольных автоколебаний самолета с необратимым гидроусилителем в системе управления" [Research of longitudinal auto-oscillations of an aeroplane with an irreversible hydraulic booster in flight control system]. Труды ЛИИ (in Russian) (65). ЛИИ.
- Миронов, А. Д.; Строев, Н. С.; Тайц, М. А.; и др. (1980). Образцов, И. Ф. (ed.). Развитие авиационной науки и техники в СССР: историко-технические очерки - Глава "Лётные исследования" [Development of aviation science and technology in the USSR: historical and technical essays - Chapter "Flight research"] (in Russian). Москва: Наука : АН СССР. p. 496.
- Тайц, М. А. (1983). Теоретические основы методов определения в полете летных характеристик самолетов : Применение теории подобия [Theoretical foundations of methods for in-flight evaluation of aeroplanes flight characteristics : The theory of similarity application]. Справочная библиотека авиационного инженера-испытателя "Летные испытания самолетов и вертолетов" (in Russian). Москва: Машиностроение. p. 128. (published posthumously).

== Literature ==
- Шевченко, В. А.; Лапин, Ю. А. (1995). Свищёв, Георгий (ed.). Знакомьтесь : город Жуковский [Meet : Zhukovsky City] (in Russian). Москва: АО "Книга графикс". pp. 91–104. ISBN 9785887010021.
- Свищёв, Георгий, ed. (1994). Авиация : Энциклопедия [Aviation : Encyclopedia] (in Russian). Москва: Большая российская энциклопедия : ЦАГИ. p. 735. ISBN 585270086X. OL 21905408M.
- Зелин, Александр, ed. (2009). Авиация России : биографическая энциклопедия : 1909-2009 [Aviation of Russia : Biographical Encyclopaedia : 1909-2009] (in Russian). Москва: Столичная энциклопедия. p. 880. ISBN 978-5-903989-03-4.
- Остапенко, Юрий, ed. (2005). XX век. Авиастроение России в лицах [Twentieth Century. Faces of Russian Aviation Industry] (in Russian). Москва: МОО «Общество авиастроителей». p. 552.
- Васильченко, К. К.; Знаменская, А. М.; Клячко, М. Д.; Махонькин, Ю. Е.; Миронов, А. Д.; Хейфец, М. И., eds. (1993). Лётные исследования и испытания. Фрагменты истории и современное состояние : Научно-технический сборник [Flight Research and Testing. Fragments of History and Present State: A Sci.-Tech. Collection] (in Russian). Москва: Машиностроение. p. 496. OCLC 32240122.
- Миронов, А. Д.; Берестов, Л. М.; Золотухин, Р. Б.; Леонова, М. Ф.; Амирьянц, В. А., eds. (2001). Лётно-исследовательский институт. События. Люди [Flight Research Institute. Events. People] (in Russian). Москва: Машиностроение : Машиностроение-Полет. p. 536. OCLC 753485116.
