= Leonid Shkadov =

Russian aeronautical engineer (1927–2003)

Leonid Mikhailovich Shkadov
- Леонид Михайлович Шкадов
- Born: 30 July 1927; Soviet Union
- Died: January 25, 2003 (aged 75); Zhukovsky
- Burial place: Bykovo Memorial Cemetery in Zhukovsky
- Citizenship: Soviet Union
- Education: Moscow Aviation Institute (1950)
- Occupations: Scientist; Engineer
- Years active: 1950–2003
- Employers: Central Aerohydrodynamic Institute (1950-1981, 1986-2003); Ministry of Aviation Industry (1981-1986)
- Known for: scientist in aerospace engineering domain, one of the TsAGI deputy directors (1986-2003)
- Title: Doctor of Science; Professor
- Awards: USSR State Prize (1977)

Signature
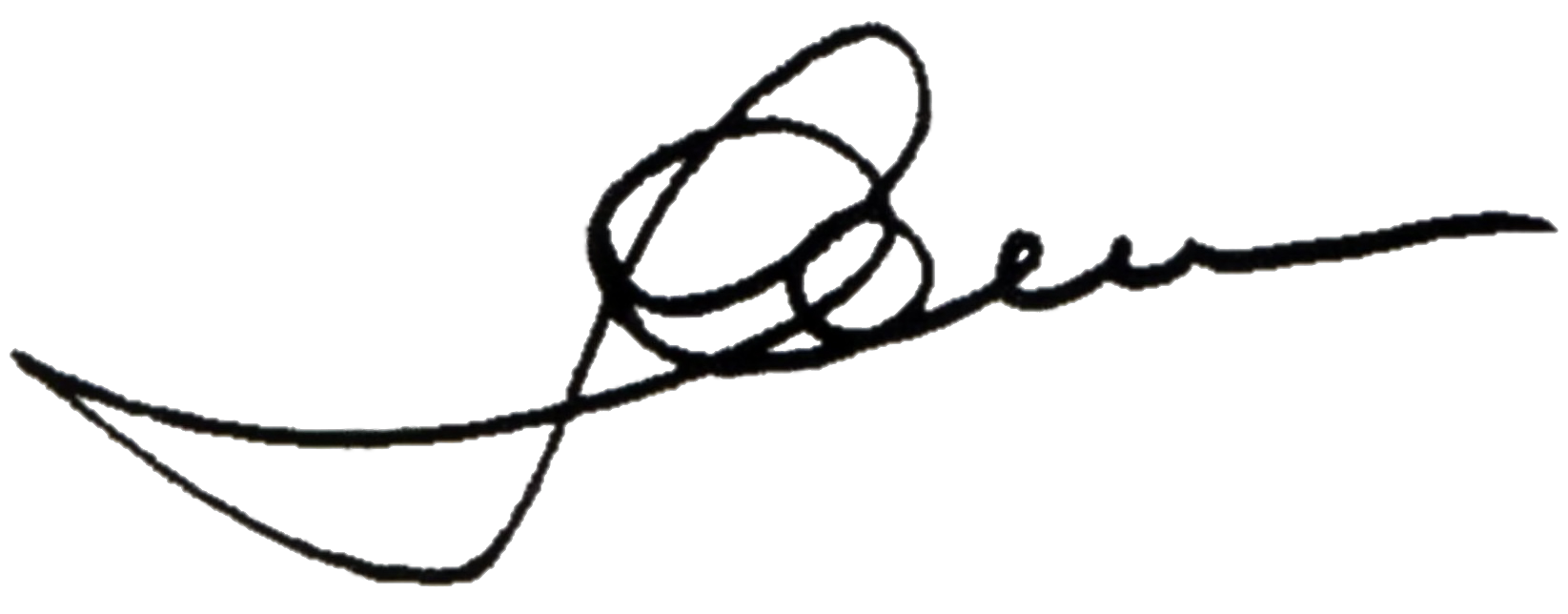

Leonid Mikhailovich Shkadov (1927–2003) was a Russian scientist, engineer in aircraft development and optimisation, one of the TsAGI deputy directors (1986-2003), a Doctor of Engineering, professor, and recipient of the USSR State Prize (1977).

Shkadov came up with the idea of the Shkadov Thruster.

== Awards and decorations ==
- USSR State Prize (1977)
- Order of the Red Banner of Labour (1971)
- Order of the Badge of Honour (1966)
- Order of Friendship (1998)
- Jubilee Medal "In Commemoration of the 100th Anniversary of the Birth of Vladimir Ilyich Lenin", Medal "Veteran of Labour" and Jubilee Medal "300 Years of the Russian Navy" (1997)
- Honoured Scientist of the RSFSR (1988)
- Honoured Aircraft Engineer of the USSR (1987)
- Zhukovsky Honorary Citizen
