= USSR V-1 =

Soviet non-rigid airship first flown in 1932

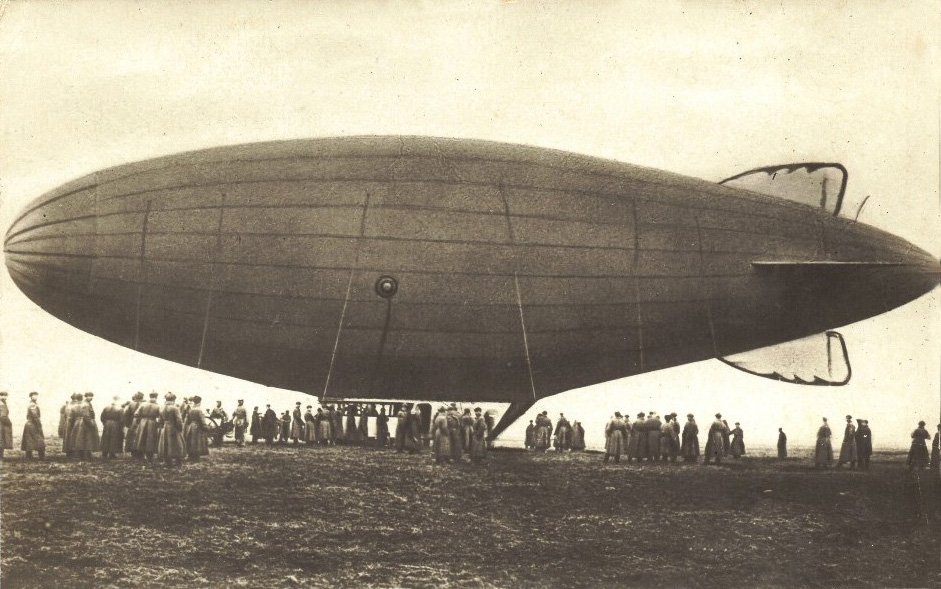
- The airship UK-1 imeni Pervogo maya ("First of May")

General information
- Type: Non-rigid airship
- Manufacturer: TsAGI; Dirizhablestroy
- Status: Rebuilt 1939; dismantled March 1940; rebuilt as USSR V-12 (April 1942)
- Primary user: Soviet Union
- Number built: 1

History
- Manufactured: 1932
- Introduction date: 1932
- First flight: 9 April 1932

USSR V-1 (Russian: «СССР В-1») was a non-rigid airship designed and built between 1930 and 1932.

== Description ==
In the autumn of 1930, employees of the TsAGI began designing a small non-rigid airship for training purposes, drawing on experience from the blimps Moskovskiy khimik-rezinschik (MKhR) and Komsomolskaya Pravda (USSR V-4). The work was carried out after hours.

The gondola frame was made of duralumin profiles; the gondola length was 10 metres. The forward canopy was celluloid, with side windows. The stabilizers and control surfaces used a duralumin frame covered with fabric.

The envelope and other parts were manufactured in Moscow by "Dirizhablestroy", the "Kauchuk" plant, and TsAGI, and were assembled in March 1932 in a hangar at Volkovo Field in Leningrad under the direction of A. N. Flakserman, deputy head of Dirizhablestroy.

The first flight took place on 9 April 1932. The airship was commanded by V. L. Nizhevsky; the crew also included assistant commander Volkonsky, second assistant commander Vladimir G. Garakanidze (one of the designers), helmsman and MAI student Ivan V. Pan'kov, and second helmsman Obodzinsky. The flight lasted 34 minutes and, despite adverse weather and the entirely new design, demonstrated good handling qualities.

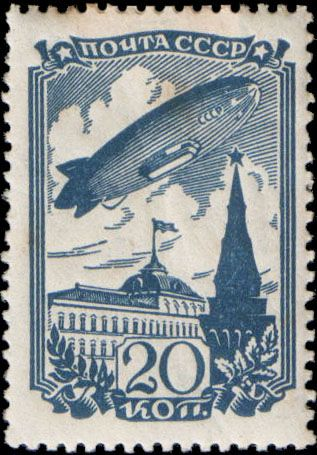
Postage stamp, 1938

On 10 April 1932, the airship made a 58-minute flight to Salizi with a landing there. Pilot V. Nizhevsky commanded; A. Flakserman flew as a passenger.

Initially the airship was called "First of May", UK-1 imeni Pervogo maya, or simply UK-1 (uchebnyy korabl’, first—training ship No. 1). It later became known by the code USSR V-1.

On 29 April 1932 USSR V-1 departed Leningrad and on 1 May 1932 arrived in Dolgoprudny. In Dolgoprudny, Dirizhablestroy was established, along with a hangar and a plant for producing hydrogen. In May 1932 Dirizhablestroy, in addition to USSR V-1, built USSR V-2 Smolny and USSR V-3 Red Star. These non-rigid airships were intended for propaganda flights and for training airship crews.

On 7 November 1932, four Soviet airships—V-1, V-2, V-3, and V-4—flew over Red Square.

On 7 April 1937, USSR V-1 was operated for the first time by an all-female crew. The commander was V. F. Demina, the wife of S. V. Demin, assistant commander of the airship USSR V-6.

By 1938 the airship was badly worn and was dismantled. In 1939 it was rebuilt with a new envelope; the first flight of the rebuilt airship took place on 1 May 1939. USSR V-1 underwent several modernizations; the USSR V-12 was created on the basis of the 1939 version.

Following a government decision to mothball Soviet airship construction, USSR V-1 was dismantled in March 1940. The airship was rebuilt in April 1942 under the designation USSR V-12.
