= Valentin Rumyantsev =

Russian scientist

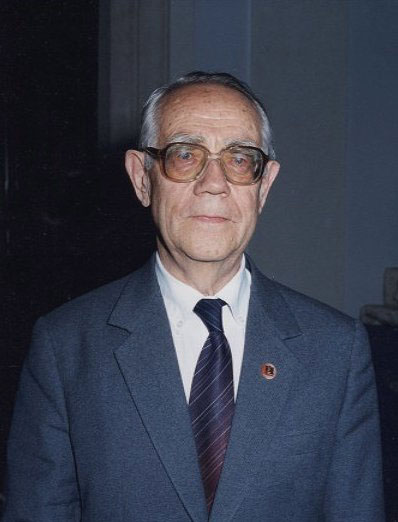
- Born: Valentin Vitalyevich Rumyantsev; 19 July 1921; Novoskatovka, Saratovsky Uyezd, Saratov Governorate, RSFSR
- Died: 10 June 2007 (aged 85)
- Education: Saratov State University
- Known for: mechanics, stability theory
- Awards: Prize of the Presidium (1950, 1958); The Chaplygin Prize (1958); The Humboldt Prize (1997); Agostinelli Prize (1999); Lyapunov Prize (2004)
- Scientific career
- Fields: Engineering (mechanics)
- Workplaces: Dorodnicyn Computing Centre
- Doctoral advisor: Nikolai Chetaev

Valentin Vitalyevich Rumyantsev (Russian: Валентин Витальевич Румянцев; 19 July 1921 – 10 June 2007) was a Russian engineer who played a crucial role in Soviet space program, mainly working on robotics and controls. He was a member of the Russian Academy of Sciences (1992), Department of Engineering, Mechanics and Control.

== Career ==
Rumyantsev was professor in the Faculty of Mechanics and Mathematics in the Department of Theoretical Mechanics and Mecatronics at Moscow State University. He was editor of the Journal of Applied Mathematics and Mechanics (Russian: Прикладная математика и механика). Rumyantsev was also a corresponding member (1995) and member (2000) of the International Academy of Astronautics (France, Paris).
