= Vladimir Alexandrov =

Russian physicist

Vladimir Valentinovich Alexandrov
- Born: 1 January 1938; Pamyat Parizhskoy Kommuny, Nizhny Novgorod Oblast, Russian SFSR
- Disappeared: 31 March 1985; Madrid, Spain
- Education: Moscow Institute of Physics and Technology
- Known for: Nuclear winter modelling
- Scientific career
- Workplaces: Moscow Institute of Physics and Technology, Dorodnitsyn Computing Centre

Vladimir Valentinovich Alexandrov (Russian: Владимир Валентинович Александров; born 1938; disappeared 1985) was a Soviet/Russian physicist who created a mathematical model for the nuclear winter theory. He disappeared while at the Second International Conference of Nuclear Free Zones Local Authorities in Cordoba, Spain on 31 March 1985 and his ultimate fate remains unknown, though speculation continues. One of his last papers was Man and Biosphere published in 1985; it is said to have charted the moving trend in the science of nuclear winter. It was co-authored with Nikita Moiseyev and A. M. Tarko.

When questioned by journalists in 1986, his acquaintances in Madrid gave differing accounts of how much he resisted when being driven towards the Soviet embassy.

In 2016 Andrew Revkin said, "He's almost assuredly dead. ...This wasn't just, you know, thumb-sucking climate science. It was in the middle of a war—a long Cold War—and there were bodies."

== Research ==
According to an FBI white paper, Alexandrov was a mathematician specializing in computer science. In 1976 he was directed to shift his research from gas dynamics and plasma mechanics to climatology. In late 1970 he was assigned to the laboratory of computational physics in climatology at the Dorodnicyn Computing Centre, working with Professor Nikita Moiseyev and A. M. Tarko. He was sent to the USA under a research exchange agreement, and studied at the NCAR in 1978, 1980 and 1982, which gave him access to the Cray-1 supercomputer. In 1983 he was directed by Evgeny Velikhov to work on nuclear winter scenarios, heading an ad hoc group of 20 scientists.

A pioneer in global climate modelling, he presented a mathematical solution to baroclinicity in 1982. The following year, with G. L. Stenchikov, he used the model to calculate the consequences of nuclear war and the prospects of nuclear winter. However, Richard P. Turco and Starley L. Thompson, two major figures in the development of the nuclear winter scenario, described Alexandrov and Stenchikov's model as "a very weak piece of work" and "a primitive rendition of an obsolete US model". Later they were to rescind these "harsh" criticisms and instead applauded Alexandrov's pioneering work, saying that the Soviet model shared the weaknesses of all the others.

== Disappearance ==
How Alexandrov disappeared and what happened to him afterward remains unknown, but several theories have been put forward. According to an article in the newsmagazine Time in October 1985, the leading thoughts on the matter were that "The mystery of his disappearance had been compounded by the suspicions of some Western scientists that the nuclear winter scenario was promoted by Moscow to give antinuclear groups in the U.S. and Europe some fresh ammunition against America's arms buildup"...and that others "speculate that Alexandrov was planning to renounce the nuclear winter concept and may have been kidnapped by the KGB. According to another theory, the physicist defected to the West."

A. Levakov suggests that his supercomputer work on nuclear winter was as embarrassing to the Soviet Union as it was to the USA. According to the Mitrokhin Archive, during a conference in 1987 the head of the KGB's First Chief Directorate Vladimir Kryuchkov accused the CIA's Deputy Director Robert Gates of kidnapping Alexandrov and holding him against his will. Andrew Revkin assumes that he was a spy; it was never clear whether for the USSR, U.S., or both.

US colleagues regarded his work on nuclear winter computer models to be on the extreme fringe, a position which toed the Soviet party line at the time – a position that, in private, he reportedly acknowledged was nonsense. US colleagues also pointed to his unorthodox denial by the US visa agency to permit him access to dual-use supercomputers, a denial which transpired after his name-dropping jokes about how he could freely access the coveted Cray X-MP at the US nuclear weapons lab LLNL, and a denial which is likely a key factor in how he could have possibly fallen so far from favor in the Soviet establishment. Someone from Moscow would attempt to "phone"/internet access this powerful US computer a few months before his disappearance.

Upon learning of the missing-person case that had not been reported on in Madrid at the time, nuclear winter colleagues, in particular the US team that included Alan Robock, took a pact not to raise the alarm as they thought it conceivable that he had defected to the West. Robock would later regret taking this pledge as a lost opportunity to find him before the trail went cold.

== See also ==
- List of people who disappeared
