= Anatoly Dorodnitsyn =

Russian-Soviet mathematician and physicist

Anatoly Alekseyevich Dorodnitsyn
- Born: December 2, 1910
- Died: June 7, 1994 (aged 83)
- Education: Grozny Oil Institute
- Known for: mechanics, stability theory Howarth–Dorodnitsyn transformation
- Awards: Orders of Lenin ((1956, 1959, 1963, 1970, 1980)); Lenin Prize (1983); Order of the October Revolution (1975)
- Scientific career
- Fields: Mathematics (Applied)
- Workplaces: TsAGI, CC RAS, MAI, MIPT
- Doctoral advisor: Nikolai Kochin

Anatoly Alekseyevich Dorodnitsyn (Russian: Анатолий Алексеевич Дородницын; 2 December 1910 [O.S. 19 November 1910] – 7 June 1994, Moscow) was a Russian mathematician who worked as an engineer in the former Soviet space program.

Dorodnitsyn was a Full member of the Russian Academy of Sciences (1953), and a professor at the department of physical and mathematical sciences (1949), majoring in geophysics.

In same cases (for example, in English version some official blanks in Russia) the following translations were also used: Anatolii instead Anatoly and (or) Dorodnicyn instead Dorodnitsyn.

== Biography ==
Dorodnitsyn was born in the village of Bashino, Kashira County (Tula Governorate), Russian Empire, the son of a village medical doctor, Alexei Petrovich Dorodnitsyn, a graduate of the University of Tartu (now Estonia), and Nina Ivanovna Dorodnitsyna, née Vyshemirskaya, the only daughter of an Orthodox priest. He was the third child in the family, with two older sisters. The family migrated to Ukraine in 1914 and lived in a village of Novaya Basan’, near Kyiv, during World War I and the Russian Civil War. Anatoly studied in a 7-grade school in the nearby village of Berezan’. The family moved to Grozny in North Caucasus, the capital of the Chechen region, in 1925, where Anatoly graduated from high school in 1927.

In the same year, Dorodnitsyn passed the entry examination at the Novocherkassk Polytechnic Institute, with honors, but was denied enrollment based on his “non-proletarian origin”. He immediately applied to, and was enrolled in, the Grozny Oil Technical School, which was one of the first higher educational institutions teaching hydrocarbon-related subjects in Russia. The hydrocarbon industry and related educational institutions were growing rapidly at the time. The technical school he studied in was upgraded to “The Grozny Oil Institute” and Dorodnitsyn graduated from it in 1931 with a degree as Oil Production Engineer.

His first employer was the Leningrad Oil Exploration Institute. The following year, he joined the Leningrad Main Geophysical Observatory, which is the oldest meteorological institution in Russia. Both these organizations created their own seismological task force, appointing Dorodnitsyn as their head and dispatching them to the Ural Mountains, Bashkortostan and Turkmenistan to conduct geological researches.

At that time, Dorodnitsyn realized there was a serious gap in his mathematical education, since only the basics of calсulus were included in the Grozny Oil Institute’s program. He devoted all his evenings after work to study mathematics; this helped radically improve his mathematical skills.

He completed his postgraduate studies at the Leningrad Main Geophysical Observatory from 1936 to 1938 under the supervision of Prof. Ilya Afanasievich Kibel, a member of the scientific school led by academician Nikolai Yevgrafovich Kochin, a leading Russian researcher in applied mathematics, particularly in the areas of fluid and gas mechanics. In 1939, Dorodnitsyn defended his thesis at Leningrad State University. The topic of the thesis was related to air flow problems around irregularities of the Earth’s surface. He received his PhD and was promoted to the position of Senior Research Fellow in the Department of Dynamic Meteorology of the Leningrad Main Geophysical Observatory.

In 1940, Dorodnitsyn entered a doctoral program led by academician Nikolai Yevgrafovich Kochin at the Institute of Mechanics of the USSR Academy of Sciences. The topic of his doctoral thesis, “Boundary layer in compressible gas”, turned out to be ground-breaking for both meteorology and aircraft theory. This was of high importance for the aircraft industry’s development during World War II and on the eve of Great Patriotic War.

In 1941 Dorodnitsyn was dispatched to TsAGI, Russia’s leading aircraft and aerospace research organization and aircraft design center, located in Zhukovsky on the outskirts of Moscow. There, he took the new position of lead engineer, approved by the Soviet Government at TsAGI’s request. Dorodnitsyn worked in TsAGI until 1961 and grew from department head to sector director and laboratory scientific head. He worked in the aviation division, which was established by TsAGI’s head Ivan Fedorovich Petrov, together with the outstanding Soviet scientists Mstislav Keldysh, Vladimir Vetchinkin, Sergey Khristianovich, Ivan Ostoslavskii, Georgii Svishchev and Sergei Shishkin. He defended his doctoral thesis on the boundary layer in a compressible gas and received a doctoral degree in technical sciences.

Dorodnitsyn worked part time at the Leningrad branch of the Steklov Mathematical Institute as a leading research fellow and later as a department head. Without the usual prior election as a corresponding member, he was elected a full member of the USSR Academy of Sciences in the department of physical and mathematical sciences, majoring in geophysics, in 1953.

== Main science works and results ==
The main academic works of Dorodnitsyn are devoted to ordinary differential equations, algebra, meteorology, vortex wing theory, boundary layer theory in a compressible gas, supersonic gas dynamics, the numerical method of integral relations, and the small parameter method for Navier–Stokes equations. Dorodnitsyn also contributed a lot to Informatics. Dorodnitsyn achieved the following main scientific results:

- He studied asymptotic behavior of solutions of certain classes of nonlinear differential equations;
- He developed the vortex theory of wings of complex shapes and proposed numerical methods for supersonic asymmetric gas flows;
- He developed a numerical method of integral relations for partial differential equations and numerical methods for Navier–Stokes equations;
- He mathematically described air currents over mountain ranges and created the theory of the boundary layer in a compressible gas.

== In higher education ==
Dorodnitsyn devoted a lot of his time to teaching.

- He taught as an associate professor at the higher mathematics department at the Leningrad Mining Institute in 1939–1940;
- He delivered lectures to post-graduate students in TsAGI as of 1941;
- He taught as a professor at the department of theoretical aerodynamics at the MAI in 1944–1946;
- He gave lectures at the faculty of physics and technology of Moscow State University (PhTF MSU) in 1947–1951;
- After PhTF MSU was detached from MSU and became an independent Moscow Institute of Physics and Technology (MIPT) in 1951, Dorodnitsyn headed the departments of aerodynamics (1953–1964), gas dynamics (1964–1967), applied mathematics (1967–1971) and mathematical physics (1971–1994) there.

== Managing of scientific programs ==
Dorodnitsyn’s activities in managing of the Soviet scientific programs were extremely important for the scientific and technological development of USSR.

- Dorodnitsyn was a founding father of the Computing Centre of USSR Academy of Sciences. He served as its director in 1955–1989, its honorary director and scientific director in 1989–1994. This centre was named after him in 2000 and became Dorodnitsyn Computing Centre of Russian Academy of Sciences.
- He was a co-founder of the USSR National Committee for theoretical and applied mechanics in 1956.
- He proposed to create the Department of Informatics in the Russian Academy of Sciences.
- He founded and for many years led as an editor-in-chief the Journal of Computational Mathematics and Mathematical Physics.
- He was a co-founder of the International Federation for information processing (IFIP) within UNESCO in 1960 that initially united 55 countries. He served as IFIP President in 1968–1971.
- He headed and served on a number of commissions and committees on computer technology, control systems and software in the USSR and at the level of COMECON, which was an analogue of European Economic Community for East-European and socialist countries.

== Memory ==
The Dorodnitsyn Computing Centre, MIPT and TsAGI held the International Conference on Applied Mathematics and Computer Science dedicated to Academician A.A. Dorodnicyn’s 100th Birthday Anniversary in 2010. A substantial part of the presentations of Russian and foreign scientists on this conference aimed at original accomplishments in the fields marked by A.A. Dorodnicyn's fundamental contributions.

== National honors and awards ==
- Order of the Badge of Honour (1943)
- Order of the Red Star (1945)
- Stalin prize II degree (1946) for work on the theory of the boundary layer
- Stalin prize II degree (1947) for design of new wings for high-speed aircraft
- Stalin prize (1951) for research in aerodynamics
- Order of the Red Banner of Labor (1954)
- Order of Lenin (1956, 1959, 1963, 1970, 1980)
- Hero of Socialist Labor (1970)
- N.M. Krylov prize of the Academy of Sciences of the Ukrainian SSR (1972, 1978)
- Order of the October Revolution (1975)
- A.N. Krylov prize of the USSR Academy of Sciences (1977)
- Prize of the Council of Ministers of the USSR (1981)
- Lenin prize (1983) for the development and implementation of the ES EVM
- Glushkov prize of the Academy of Sciences of the Ukrainian SSR (1983)
- Order of Friendship of Peoples (1986)
- Medal of Vladimir Nikolaevich Chelomey

== Foreign honors and awards ==
- Foreign member of the Bulgarian Academy of Sciences (1970)
- Order of Friendship (Vietnam), (1982)
- Order of Saints Cyril and Methodius (people's Republic of Bulgaria, 1987)
- Medal of the City of Paris (Silver)
- Medals оf the academies of Sciences of the GDR, Bulgaria and Mongolia

== Selected bibliography ==
Collection of works

After Anatoly Dorodnitsyn’s disease, editorial Board, composed of Alexander Abramov, Oleg Belotserkovskii, E. M. Dobryshman, Yuri Yevtushenko, Yuri Zhuravlev, Boris Pal'tsev, Vladimir Sychev, Leonid Turchak, Yuri Shmyglevskii (resp. ed.) compiled and published in the publishing house CCRAS in 1997 two volumes of selected scientific works of Anatoly Dorodnitsyn.

- Dorodnitsyn A. A. Selected scientific works, Vol. 1. / Ed. "Yuri D. Shmyglevskii". Moscow: EC RAS, 1997. 396 p. issue 1000 PCs. ISBN 5-201-14719-4. (rus.)
- Dorodnitsyn A. A. Selected scientific works, vol. 2. / ed. "Yu. D. Shmyglevsky". Moscow: EC RAS, 1997. 352 p. issue 1000 PCs. ISBN 5-201-14719-4. (rus.)

=== In Science database ===
- zbMATH: Dorodnitsyn, Anatoliĭ Alekseevich
- Math-Net.Ru: Dorodnitsyn, Anatolii Alekseevich

== Literature about Dorodnitsyn ==
- Belotserkovsky O. M. 50 years together (Memories of academician A. A. Dorodnitsyn). Subtitle "to the 100th anniversary of his birth" Ed. doctor of physical and mathematical Sciences B. V. Pal'tsev. Moscow: CC RAS, 2010. Pages 33–43. (rus.)
- Dorodnitsyna V. V., Yevtushenko Yu. G., Shevchenko V. V. Academician A. A. Dorodnitsyn: life as a daring time (to the 105th anniversary of his birth). // Under the General editorship of prof. Sergey Ya. Stepanov. M.: CC RAS, 2015. 466 p. Format 60*90 1/8 (210*298 mm). 300 pieces. ISBN 978-5-906693-26-6. (rus.)

== See also ==
- Dorodnitsyn transformation
