= Pelageya Polubarinova-Kochina =

Russian mathematician

- Пелагея Полубаринова-Кочина
- Born: 13 May 1899; Verkhny Khutor, Tsarevsky Uyezd, Astrakhan Governorate, Russian Empire
- Died: 3 July 1999 (aged 100); Moscow, Russia
- Education: Petrograd University
- Spouse: Nikolai Kochin (m. 1925)
- Scientific career
- Fields: Applied mathematics
- Workplaces: Petrograd University; Steklov Institute; University of Novosibirsk

Pelageya Yakovlevna Polubarinova-Kochina (Russian: Пелагея Яковлевна Полубаринова-Кочина; 13 May [O.S. 1 May] 1899 – 3 July 1999) was a Soviet and Russian applied mathematician, known for her work on fluid mechanics and hydrodynamics, particularly, the application of Fuchsian equations, as well in the history of mathematics. She was elected a corresponding member of the Academy of Sciences of the Soviet Union in 1946 and full member (academician) in 1958.

== Biography ==
Born on 13 May [O.S. 1 May] 1899 in the Russian Empire to an accountant and a housewife, Pelageya was the second youngest of four children. She studied at a women's high school in Saint Petersburg and went on to Petrograd University (after the Russian Revolution). After her father died in 1918, she started working at the laboratory of geophysics under the supervision of Alexander Friedmann. There she met Nikolai Kochin; they were married in 1925 and had two daughters. The two taught at Petrograd University until 1934, when they moved to Moscow, where Nikolai Kochin took a teaching position at the Moscow University. In Moscow, Polubarinova-Kochina did research at the Steklov Institute until World War II, when she and their daughters were evacuated to Kazan while Kochin stayed in Moscow to work on aiding the military effort. He died before the war was over.

After the war, she edited his lectures and continued to teach applied mathematics. She was later head of the department of theoretical mechanics at the University of Novosibirsk and director of the department of applied hydrodynamics at the Hydrodynamics Institute. She was one of the founders of the Siberian Branch of the Russian Academy of Sciences (then the Academy of Sciences of the Soviet Union) at Novosibirsk.

She was awarded the Stalin Prize in 1946, was made a Hero of Socialist Labour in 1969 and received the Order of Friendship of Peoples in 1979. She died in 1999, a few months after her 100th birthday, and shortly after publishing her last scientific article.

== Selected publications ==
=== Fluid mechanics ===
- Polubarinova-Kočina, P. Ya. (1952). Theory of motion of ground water. Moscow: Gosudarstv. Izdat. Tehn.-Teor. Lit. MR 0056408., translated as Polubarinova-Kochina, P. Ya. (1962). Theory of ground water movement. Princeton, NJ: Princeton University Press. MR 0142252.

=== History of mathematics ===
- Kochina, P. Ya. (1981). Sofʹya Vasilʹevna Kovalevskaya. Scientific-Biographic Series (in Russian). Moscow: Nauka. MR 0652930., translated as Kochina, Pelageya (1985). Love and mathematics: Sofya Kovalevskaya. Moscow: Mir. MR 1078840.
