= Dorodnitsyn Computing Centre =

Russian computer science research institute

- Вычислительный центр им. А. А. Дородницына РАН
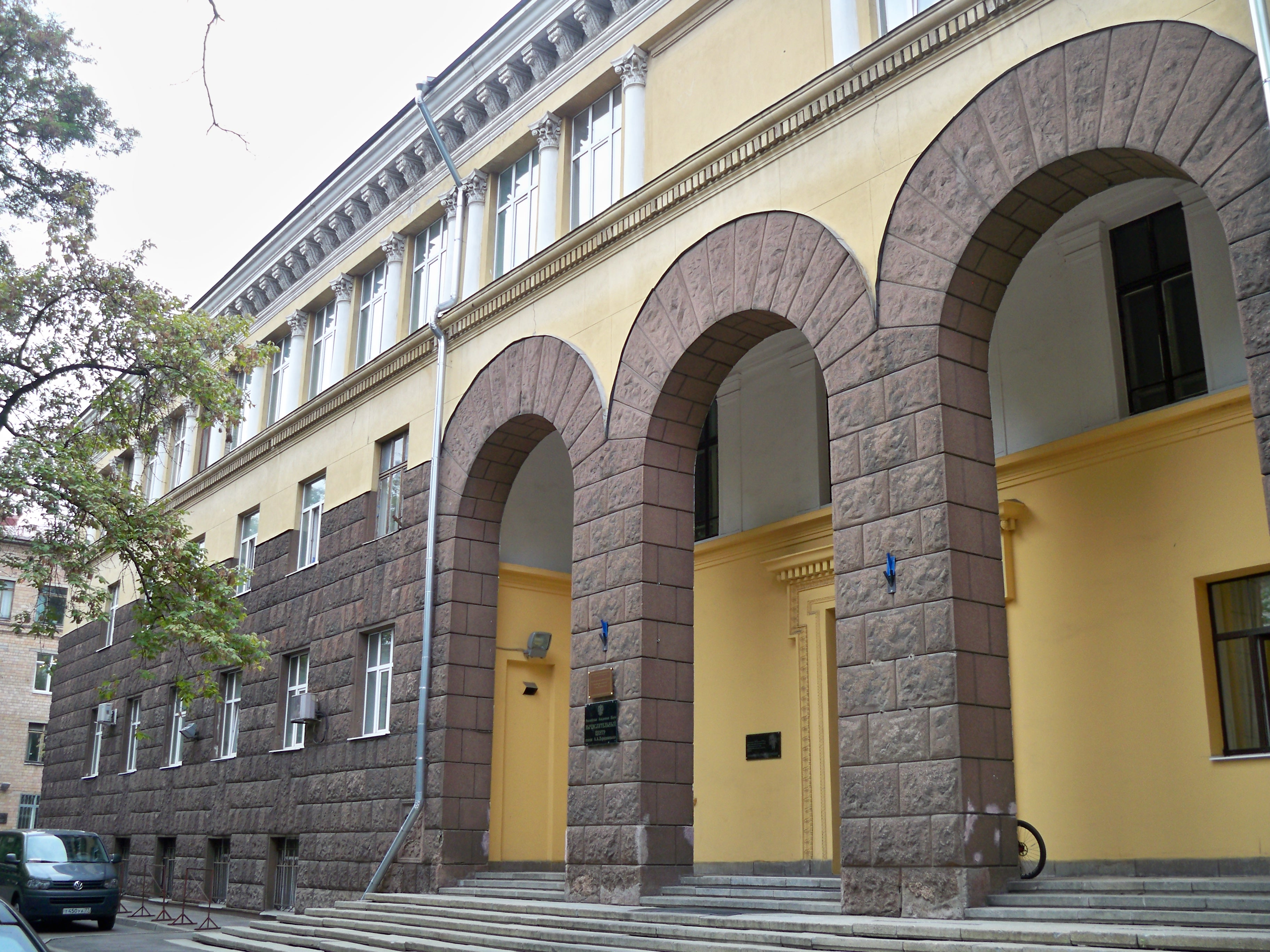
- Building of the Dorodnitsyn Computing Centre
- Type: Academic institute
- Established: 1955
- Students: 120
- Location: Moscow, Russia; 55.6943°N 37.5652°E
- Website: www.ccas.ru

The Dorodnitsyn Computing Centre (Вычислительный центр им. А. А. Дородницына РАН), formerly known as the Computing Centre of the Russian Academy of Sciences (CC RAS), was a research institute in Moscow specializing in computer science and applied mathematics. It was founded in 1955 as the Computing Center of the USSR Academy of Sciences. The centre was named after its first director, Anatoly Dorodnitsyn.

== History ==
Plans for creating a national computing center in the USSR began in December 1951, when the Presidium of the USSR Academy of Sciences approved a resolution to establish such an institute. By August 1954, the USSR Council of Ministers officially confirmed its construction, and in early 1955, the Presidium received a progress report from scientists including S. A. Lebedev and M. A. Lavrentyev.

The construction of the Computing Centre building was completed by mid-1955. Key figures involved in its foundation were Academicians I. M. Vinogradov, S. A. Lebedev, and A. A. Dorodnitsyn.

The centre began functioning in February 1955, with its initial staff coming mainly from the Department of Applied Mathematics at the Steklov Mathematical Institute and the Institute for Precision Mechanics and Computer Engineering (ITMiVT). A proposed alternate name was "Institute of Cybernetics", which was later adopted by a different institution in Kyiv.

Since 1992 the centre operated under the Russian Academy of Sciences.

== Scientists ==
- Andrey Ershov
- Andrey Markov Jr.
- Nikita Moiseyev
- Valentin Vital'yevich Rumyantsev
- Yuri Zhuravlyov
- Leonid Khachiyan
- Vladimir Alexandrov
