= Nikolai Kochin =

Russian-Soviet physicist

Nikolai Yevgrafovoch Kochin
- Born: May 19, 1901
- Died: December 31, 1944 (aged 43)
- Education: Petrograd University
- Known for: mechanics, stability theory
- Scientific career
- Fields: Mechanician
- Workplaces: Moscow State University
- Doctoral advisor: Sergey Chaplygin
- Doctoral students: Anatoly Dorodnitsyn

Nikolai Yevgrafovich Kochin (Russian: Николай Евграфович Кочин; 19 May 1901, St Petersburg – 31 December 1944, Moscow) was a Russian and Soviet mathematician specialising in applied mathematics, and especially fluid and gas mechanics.

== Biography ==
Kochin graduated from Petrograd University in 1923. He taught mathematics and mechanics at Leningrad State University from 1924 to 1934.

In 1925 Kochin married Pelageya Polubarinova. They had two daughters.

In 1928 Kochin spent a semester in Göttingen, where he helped Gamow to solve the alpha decay problem through quantum tunneling.

Kochin moved to Moscow 1934. He taught mathematics and mechanics at Moscow State University from 1934 until his death, and was the head of the mechanics section of the Mechanics Institute of the USSR Academy of Sciences from 1939 to 1944. In 1943 Kochin became ill with sarcoma and died in 1944.

== Research interests ==
Kochin's research was on meteorology, gas dynamics and shock waves in compressible fluids. He gave the solution to the problem of small amplitude waves on the surface of an uncompressed liquid in Towards a Theory of Cauchy-Poisson Waves in 1935. He also worked on the pitch and roll of ships. In aerodynamics he introduced formulae for aerodynamic force and for the distribution of pressure.

== Bibliography ==
Kochin wrote textbooks on hydromechanics and vector analysis:

1. Theoretical hydromechanics, by N. E. Kochin, I. A. Kibel, and N. V. Roze. Translated from the fifth Russian ed. by D. Boyanovitch. Edited by J. R. M. Radok. Publisher: New York, Interscience Publishers, [1965,1964]

Articles

- Kochin N. On the instability of von Karman vortex streets
- Comptes Rendus de l'Académie des Sciences de l'URSS 24: 19-23 1939

== External Biographies ==
=== Articles ===
1. Biography in Dictionary of Scientific Biography (New York 1970-1990).
2. S. M. Belotserkovskii, The work of N. E. Kochin and some current problems of aerodynamics and hydrodynamics, N E Kochin and the development of mechanics, 'Nauka' (Moscow, 1984), 115-130.
3. A. A. Dorodnitsyn, N. E. Kochin-principles and system of the scientist's work (Russian), N. E. Kochin and the development of mechanics, 'Nauka' (Moscow, 1984), 8-12.
4. A. Yu. Ishlinskii, Nikolai Evgrafovich Kochin (Russian), N. E. Kochin and the development of mechanics, 'Nauka' (Moscow, 1984), 5-8.
5. A. Yu. Ishlinskii, N. E. Kochin and theoretical mechanics, N. E. Kochin and the development of mechanics, 'Nauka' (Moscow, 1984), 169-174.
6. S. A. Khristianovich, The works of N. E. Kochin (Russian), N. E. Kochin and the development of mechanics, 'Nauka' (Moscow, 1984), 13-19.
7. Nikolai Evgrafovich Kochin (on the occasion of the ninetieth anniversary of his birth) (Russian), Prikl. Mat. Mekh. 55 (4) (1991), 533-534.

=== Books ===
- P. Ya. Polubarinova-Kochina, Life and Work of N. Y. Kochin (Leningrad, 1950).

=== Obituary ===
- Nikolai Evgrafovich Kochin (Russian), Appl. Math. Mech. 9 (1945), 3-12.
