= Nikita Moiseyev =

Soviet and Russian mathematician

Nikita Nikolaevich Moiseyev
- Born: 10 August 1917; Moscow, Russian Empire
- Died: 29 February 2000 (aged 82); Moscow, Russia
- Education: Doctor of Science (1955)
- Alma mater: Moscow State University (1941)
- Scientific career
- Fields: Mechanics, Mathematics
- Workplaces: Moscow Institute of Physics and Technology, Dorodnitsyn Computing Centre
- Doctoral students: Vladimir Alexandrov

Nikita Nikolayevich Moiseyev (Russian: Никита Николаевич Моисеев) (23 August 1917 – 29 February 2000) was a Soviet and Russian mathematician, full member of the Soviet and Russian Academies of Sciences and of the International Academy of Science, Munich.

== Biography ==
Moiseyev studied in Moscow State University, and received his doctor's degree from the Steklov Institute. He taught in Bauman Moscow State Technical University and Rostov State University after the war, and was appointed professor in Moscow Institute of Physics and Technology (1956) and became its dean in the department of applied mathematics. His fields of study included applied mathematics, solid state dynamics in liquids, systems analysis, control of the artificial space objects, dynamics of biosphere and its stability (including consequences of nuclear war — "nuclear winter"). Since 1956 till his death he also worked at the Dorodnicyn Computing Centre. He organized the Russian Section of Green Cross International and became its first President. Nominating him for the 1994 Global 500 Roll of Honour UNEP stated: "He is a member of the Russian Academy of Sciences, whose spectrum of interests and activities brought him from computing military missile trajectories to mathematical modelling of the pernicious effects of a large scale nuclear war, to his current involvement in environmental activities aimed at protecting future generations."
