= Pamyat Parizhskoy Kommuny =

Pamyat Parizhskoy Kommuny Память Парижской Коммуны
- Town
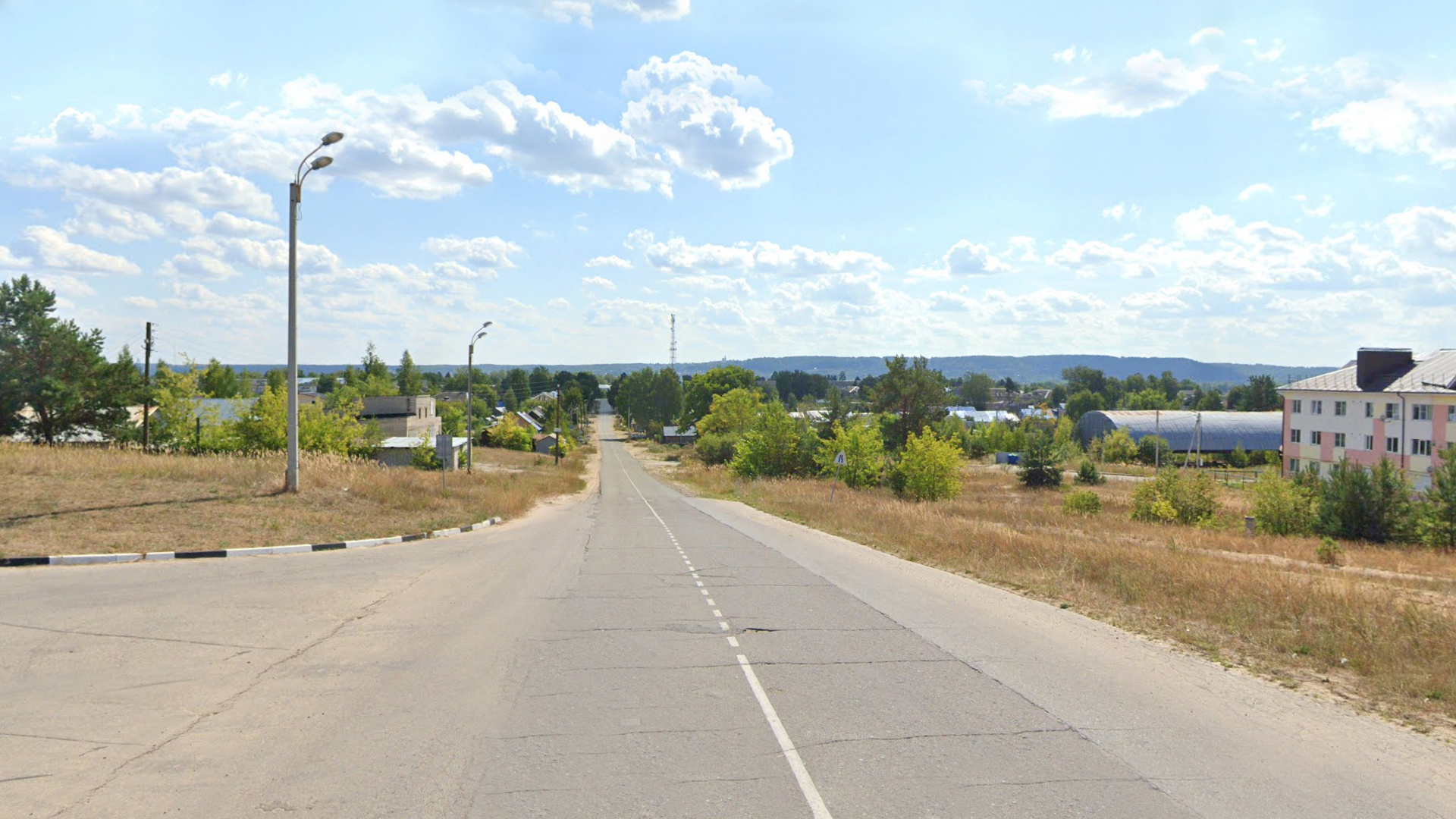

- Coat of arms
- Nicknames: PPK, Paris
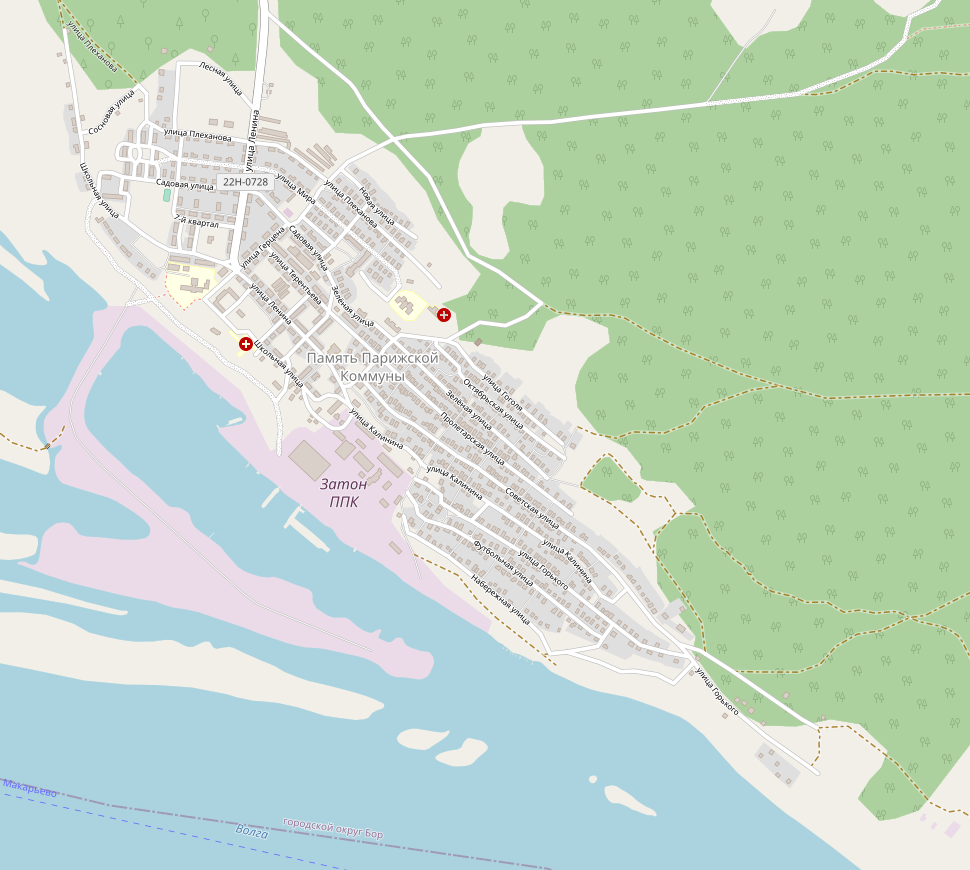
- Pamyat Parizhskoy Kommuny map
- Coordinates: 56.107237°N 44.492927°E
- Country: Russia
- Region: Nizhny Novgorod Oblast
- County: Bor
- Selsoviet: Pamyat Parizhskoy Kommuny
- Founded: 1869
- Named for: Paris Commune

Government
  - Head: Evgeny Zhogonov

Population
  - Total: 3,519
- Time zone: UTC+3
- Postal code: 606488

Pamyat Parizhskoy Kommuny (Russian: Память Парижской Коммуны, lit. 'Memory of the Paris Commune') is a settlement in the Bor urban okrug of the Nizhny Novgorod Oblast.

== Geography ==
A settlement on the left bank of the Volga, 51 km below the Bor city, where a shipyard is located. On February 1, 1932, the village at the backwater “Pamyat Parizhskoy Kommuny” of the Rabotkinsky district was transformed into a workers' settlement, leaving its former name. Until 2004, the town had the status of an urban-type settlement.

== History ==
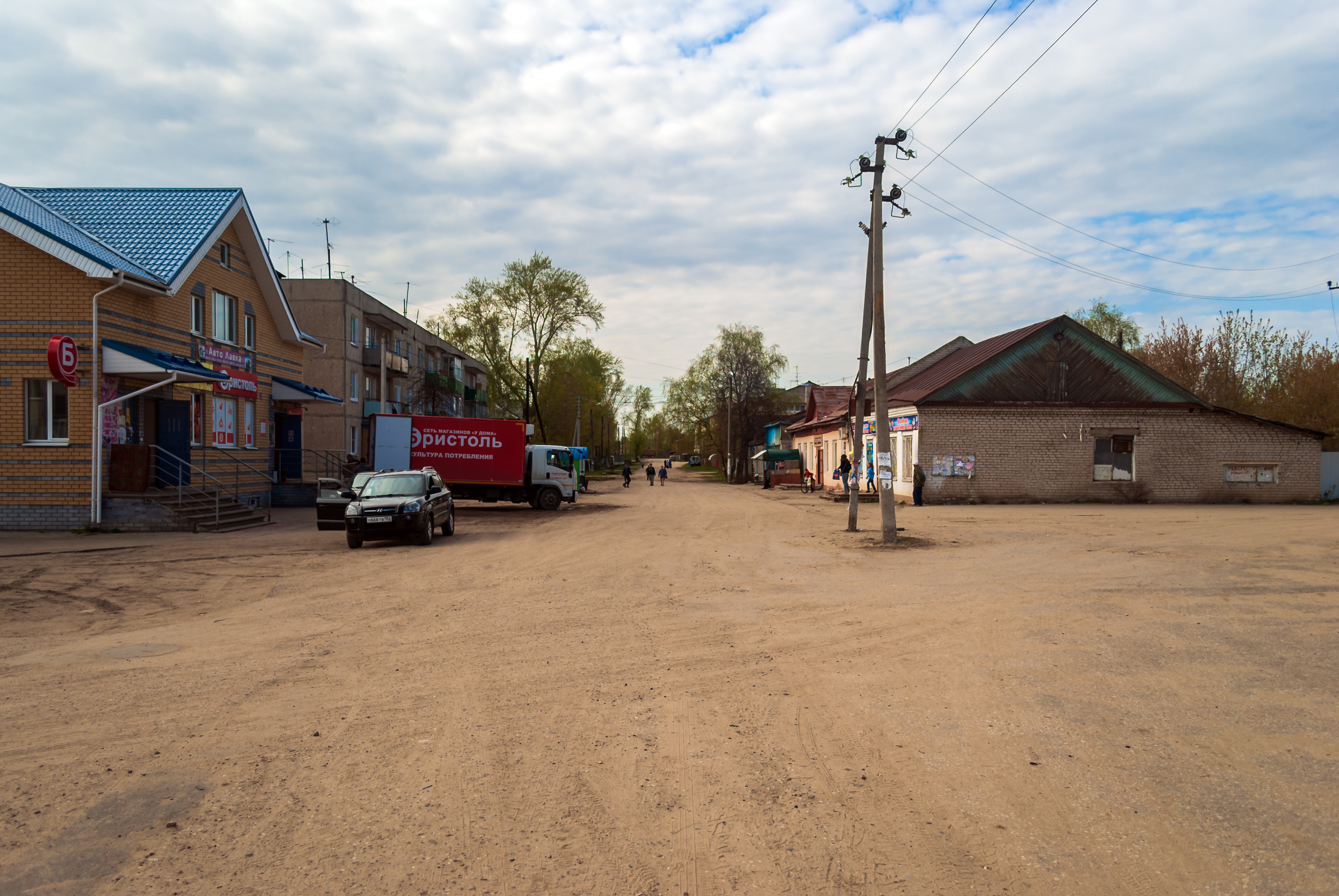
Market Square

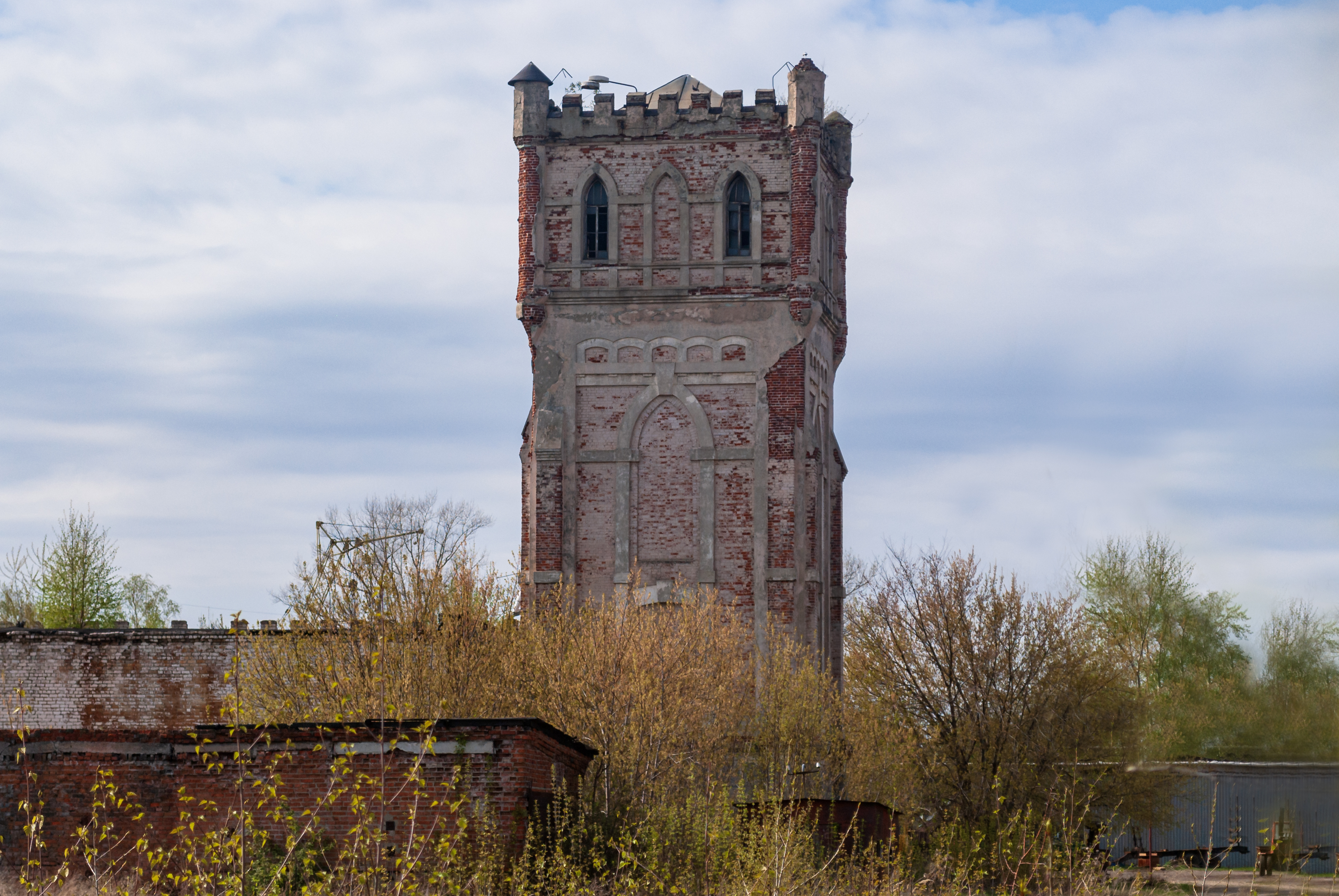
Water tower of a shipyard

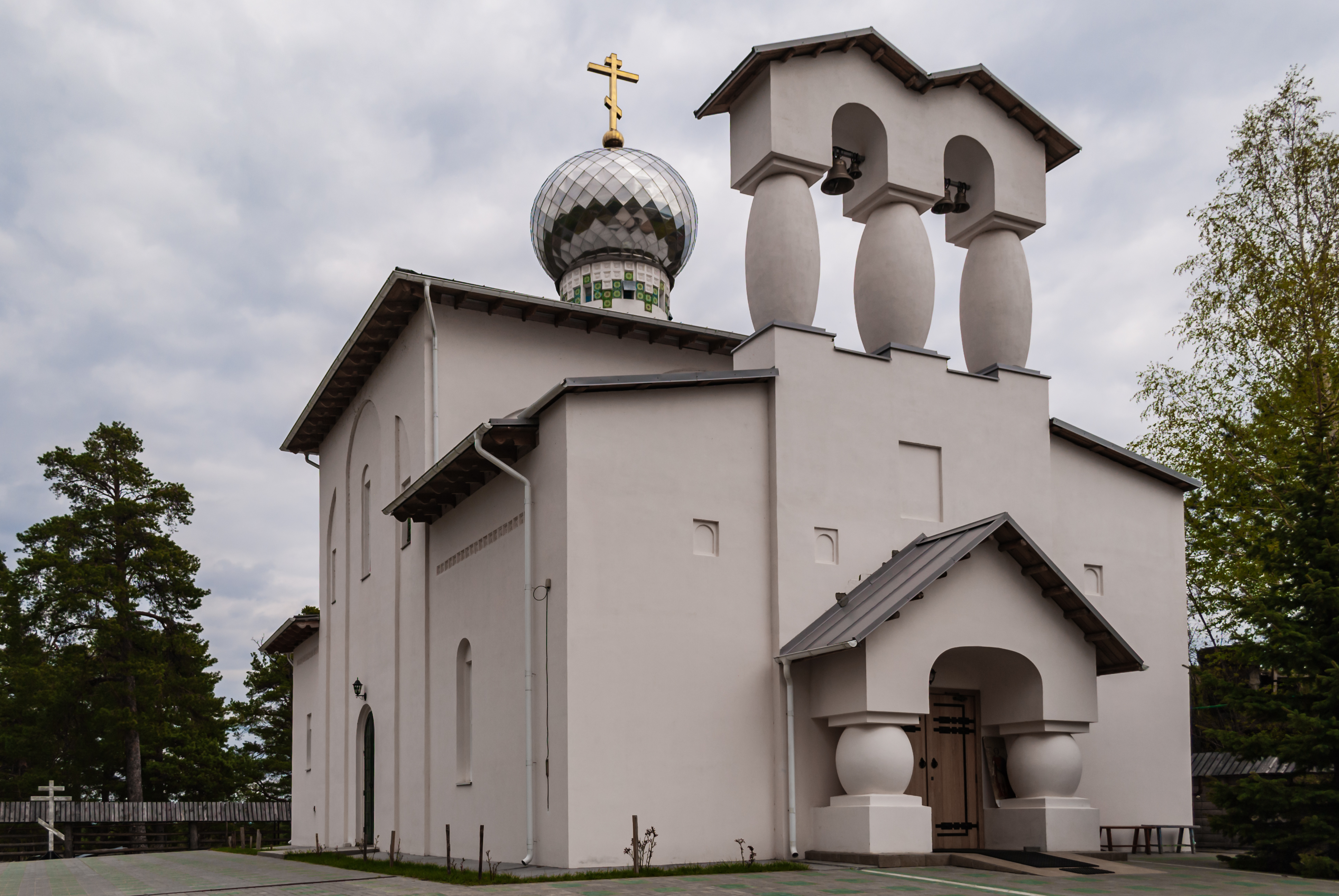
Temple in honor of the Sovereign Icon of the Mother of God

The first mention of the village dates back to 1869. In the same year, the lands of the Zhukovsky backwater were purchased by the merchant Ivan Milyutin for one and a half thousand silver rubles. The first workshops providing repair of ships appeared.

In 1886, the active development of the town began: the construction of the first houses for the purpose of permanent housing.

In 1917-1918 the ships were nationalized. During the civil war, when military operations were going on on the Volga, the Volga military flotilla was organized in Nizhny Novgorod. Ships were being re-equipped at the plant: for hospitals and the headquarters ship Markin.

In 1923, the Zhukovsky backwater was renamed the Pamyat Parizhskoy Kommuny backwater, and in 1932 it was given the status of a small town. In 1938, Vladimir Alexandrov, a well-known physicist and one of the main authors of the “nuclear winter” concept, was born there. During the World War II, the workers of the plant carried out defense orders: they made mines and snowmobiles. Vessels of the Volga military flotilla were sent to the town for repairs. Most of the inhabitants of the town went to the front and the defense of Gorky from German air raids. More than three hundred of them died. In memory of them, a memorial complex was erected on the square of the town.

There were twelve heroes of the Soviet Union in Bor urban okrug, two of them were residents of the town: Dmitry Kalinin and Grigory Terentyev. After the war, expanded construction of houses, ships and workshops was resumed.

At the beginning of the 2010s. there were more than 40 units of the fleet in the backwater. The main activity of the inhabitants of the town is work at the shipyard.

In 1996, a temple was founded in the settlement in honor of the Sovereign Icon of the Mother of God. Initially, the boiler room of the hospital was adapted for the temple. Then, from 2013 to 2017, the temple was rebuilt by the parishioners and the rector at their own expense.

== Population ==
3,519 (2021 census); 3,761 (2010 census); 4,072 (2002 census); 4,968 (1989 Soviet census).
