= Department of Aeromechanics and Flight Engineering of MIPT =

Moscow Institute of Physics and Technology faculty

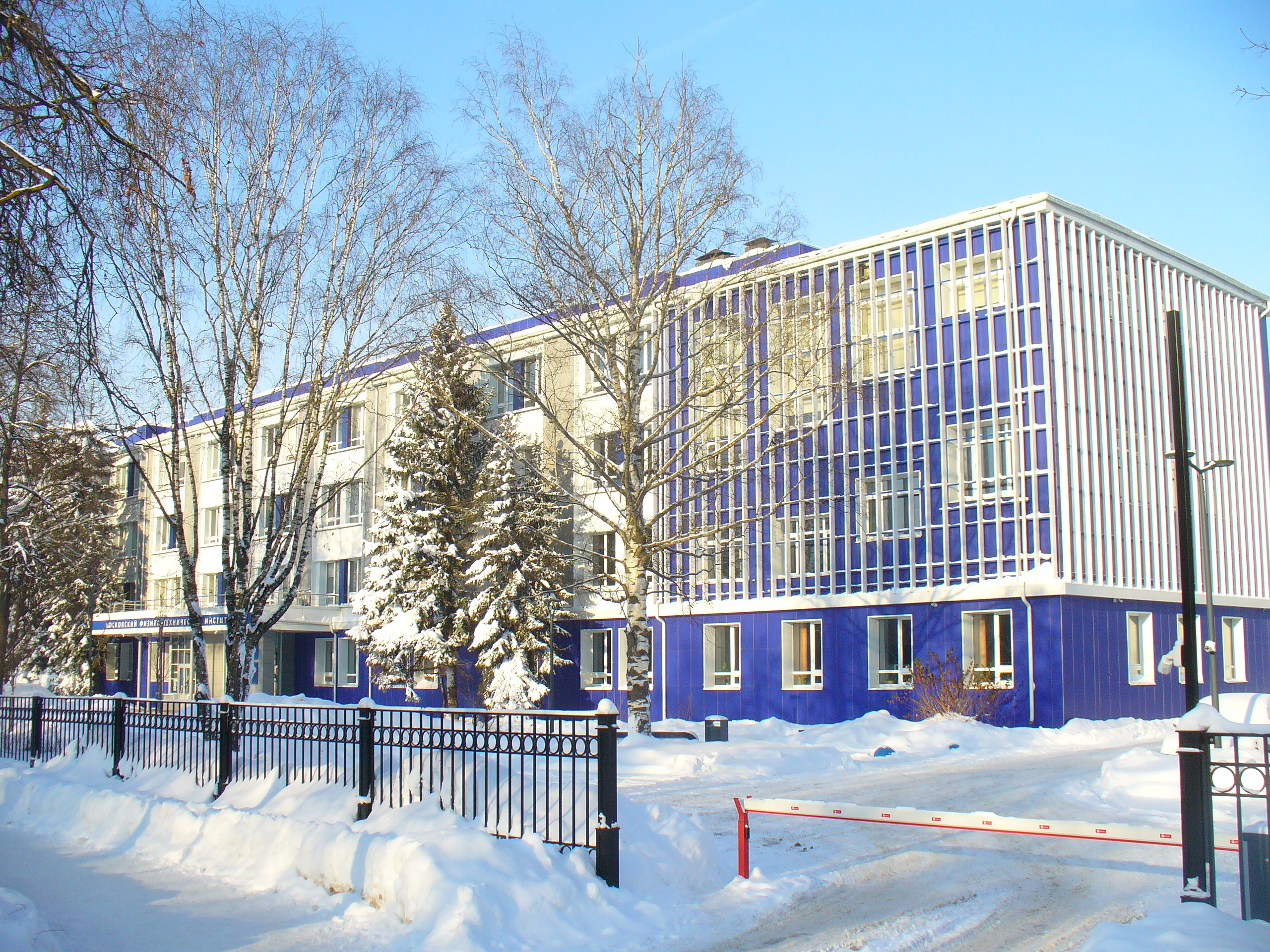
The main building

The Department of Aeromechanics and Flight Engineering, the DAFE (Russian: Факультет аэромеханики и летательной техники, ФАЛТ, FALT) is one of the departments (faculties) of the Moscow Institute of Physics and Technology. It is located in Zhukovsky a suburb south-east of Moscow. Nearby the Institute there is a dormitory, which has been considerably reconditioned since 2007. The incumbent dean's name is Victor Vyshinsky. Also, there are two deputy deans and each year has its own curator. They are supervising educational process, making a resolve on the size of students' scholarship, and affirm orders of expulsion.

== History ==
The department was established in 1965 for preparing young specialists able to solve complex problems in aerospace domain primarily for Central Aerohydrodynamic Institute (TsAGI) and Gromov Flight Research Institute (GFRI) in Zhukovsky city. The founders of this faculty were academicians Sergey Khristianovich, A.A. Dorodnitsyn, O.M. Belotserkovskyii, ministers of education and aircraft industry V. Stoletov and P. Dementyev, chief designer V.M. Myasishchev. At the base of the DAFE there is Zhukovsky's school, one of the oldest Russian scientific schools. Before the establishment of the department there was the Aeromechanics Department of MIPT, which has divided into the DAFE and the Department of Aerophysics and Space Research (ФАКИ). Among the other departments of Phystech the DAFE has its own number six.

=== History of deans ===
- Simonov Lev Alexeyevich 1965–1977
- Kalyazhnov Vladimir Vladimirovich 1977–1978
- Dorokhin Nikolai Nikolayevich 1979–1987
- Khlopkov Yuri Ivanovich 1987–2002
- Dudin Georgi Nikolayevich 2002–2008
- Vyshinsky Victor Victorovich 2008–2015

=== Notable events ===
- In 1965 there was the first intake. Classes were directed by skilled professionals of TSAGI. A year later the subdepartment of general physics had been established.
- In 1969 new subdepartments created, specifically the Applied Mechanics subdepartment.
- In 1975 the Hydrodynamics and Aeroacoustics subdepartment founded.
- During the 1980s, the department was continuing to develop. Average graduation reached a hundred people per annum.
- In February 2005 there was a renovation to the auditoriums of foreign languages.
- In 2005 the department celebrated its fortieth anniversary.
- In 2008 the 48th All-Russian Physical Competition for schoolchildren took place here.
- Every two years the DAFE faculty and its alumni take part in MAKS the International Air Show held in Zhukovsky. The last one was in summer 2009.

== Admissions and demographics ==
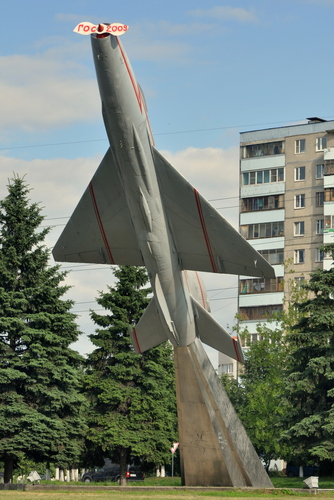
A propeller at the Mig-21 jet monument with an inscription «ГОС 2009» («State Exam 2009»)

The department is located separately from the others, therefore it is not very popular among school leavers. Practically, most of those who are going to enter it have been interested in aviation in their schooldays. The highest percent of foreign students of MIPT is here.

Till year 2005 there were 2630 students, including 249 girls (9.5% of all) graduated here.

== Department features ==
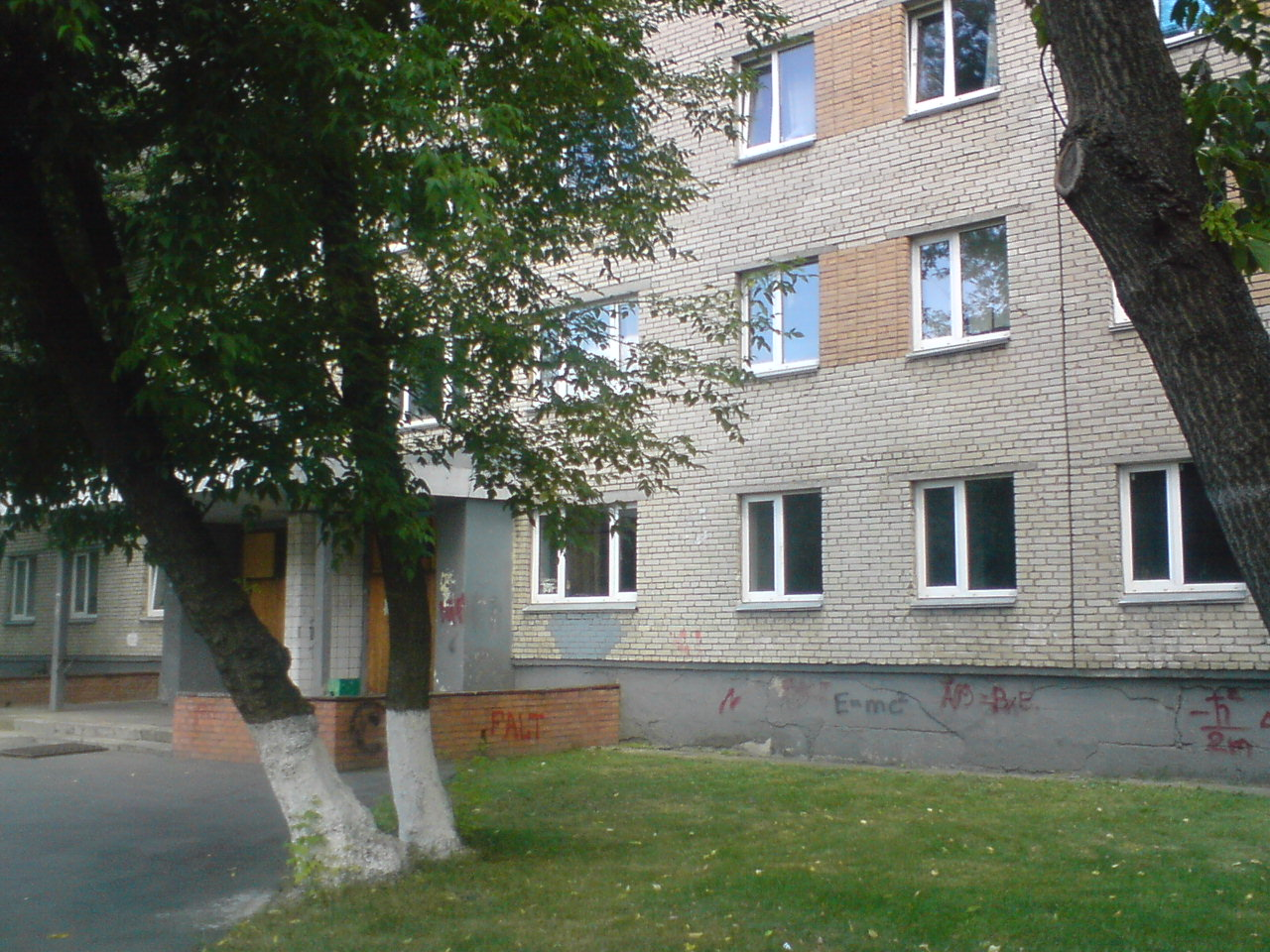
A painted wall of the DAFE hostel

Unlike the other departments based in Dolgoprudny this one is situated in Zhukovsky, in a result of this the functioning of the department and its traditions are different. Particularly, the faculty has an independent general physics subdepartment and an independent subdepartment of foreign languages. Except the English language there are German, French and Spanish also available to study in the senior years.

The most notable of the local traditions are following. In November students celebrate passing the state exams. During this event the tradition is to hang a propeller on the monument of MiG-21 and to erect a top hat on Zhukovsky's statue. Moreover, in their third-year students' banquet the 1001st night under the roof of the Institute signify this occasion with burning an effigy of Botan ("nerd").

Since November 2008 students publish an in-house newspaper Free Flier («Свободный полёт»).
