= Central Aerohydrodynamic Institute =

Russian aerospace research centre

Coordinates: 55°35′36″N 38°06′24″E

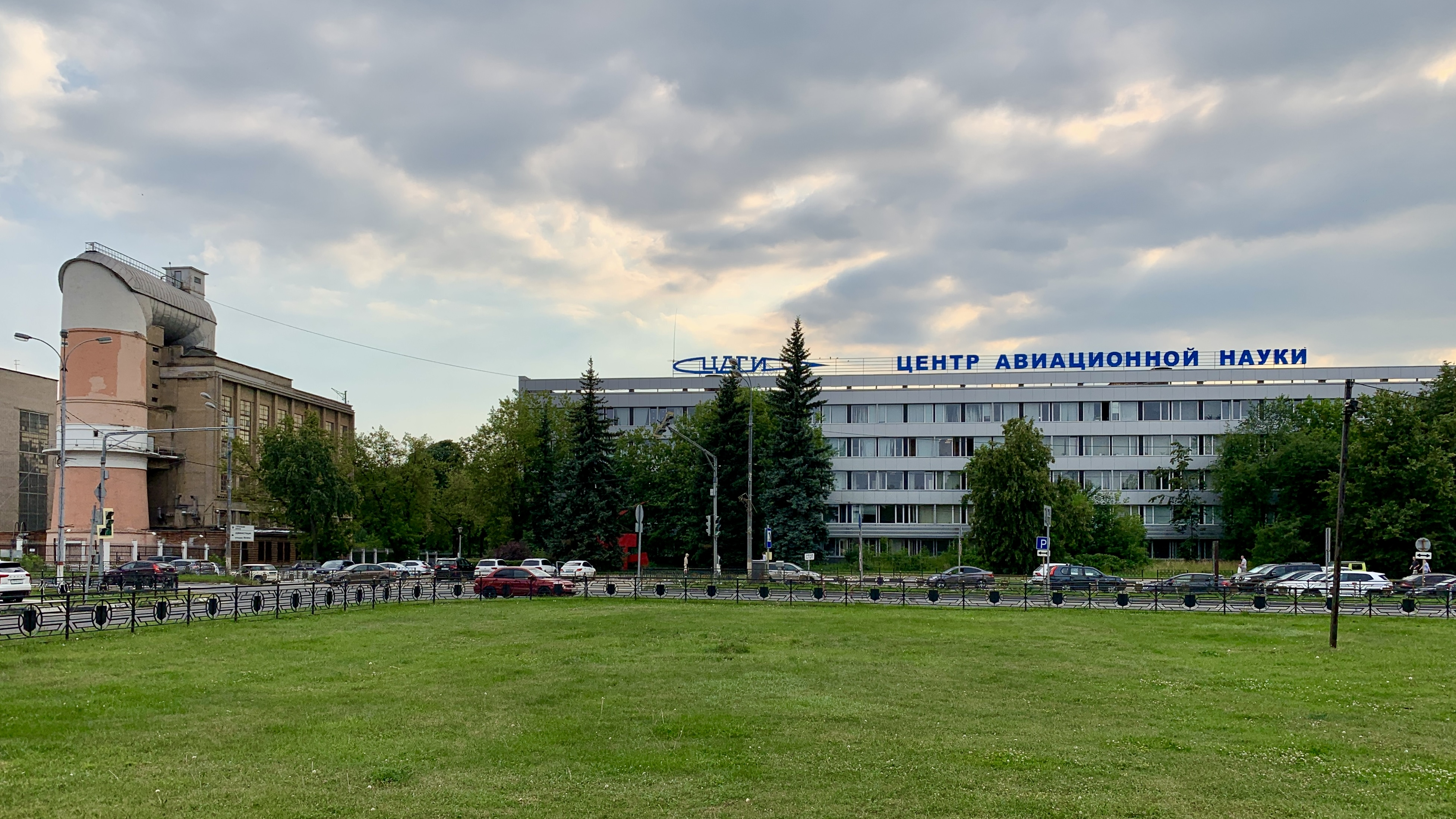
- TsAGI's engineering building (centre) and stall-spin testing aerodynamic tube (left, built 1941)
- Native name: Центра́льный аэрогидродинами́ческий институ́т имени профессора Н. Е. Жуковского
- Type: federal state unitary enterprise
- Industry: Aerospace
- Founded: 1918; 108 years ago
- Founder: Nikolay Zhukovsky
- Headquarters: Zhukovsky, Russia
- Area served: Worldwide
- Key people: Aleksandr Medvedsky - General Director; Sergey Chernyshev - Research Director
- Owner: Russian Federation
- Number of employees: 4,392 (2013)
- Website: tsagi.com

The Central Aerohydrodynamic Institute (also (Zhukovsky) Central Institute of Aerodynamics, Russian: Центра́льный аэрогидродинами́ческий институ́т, ЦАГИ, romanized: Tsentral'nyy Aerogidrodinamicheskiy Institut, TsAGI) is a Russian national research centre for aviation. It was founded in Moscow by Russian aviation pioneer Nikolai Yegorovich Zhukovsky on December 1, 1918.

== History ==
From 1925 and up to the 1930s, TsAGI developed and hosted Tupolev's AGOS (Aviatziya, Gidroaviatziya i Opytnoye Stroitelstvo, the "Aviation, Hydroaviation, and Experimental Construction"), the first aircraft design bureau in Soviet Union, and at the time the main one. In 1930, two other major aircraft design bureaus in the country were the Ilyushin's TsKB (Tsentralnoye Konstruksionnoye Byuro means "Central Design Bureau") and an independent, short-lived Konstantin Kalinin's team in Kharkiv.

In 1935 TsAGI was partly relocated to the former dacha settlement Otdykh (literally, "Relaxation") converted to the new urban-type settlement Stakhanovo. It was named after Alexey Stakhanov, a famous Soviet miner. On April 23, 1947, the settlement was granted town status and renamed to Zhukovsky. The Moscow branch of the institute is known as the Moscow complex of TsAGI. In 1965 the Department of Aeromechanics and Flight Engineering of MIPT was established in Zhukovsky to educate specialists for aerospace industry.

TsAGI participated in the Energia rocket and the Space Shuttle Buran projects.

== Heads of the institute ==
- 1918–1921: N. Y. Zhukovsky
- 1921–1931: S. A. Chaplygin
- 1932–1937: N. M. Kharlamov
- 1938–1939: M. N. Shulzhenko
- 1940–1941: I. F. Petrov
- 1941–1950: S. N. Shishkin
- 1950–1960: A. I. Makarevsky
- 1960–1967: V. M. Myasishchev
- 1967–1989: G. P. Swischjov
- 1989–1995: G I. Zagaynov
- 1995–1998: V. Ja. Neuland
- 1998–2006: V. G. Dmitriyev
- 2006–2007: V. A. Kargopoltsev
- 2007–2009: S. L. Chernyshev
- 2009–2015: B. S. Aljoshin
- 2015–2018: S. L. Chernyshev
- 2018–2026: K. I. Sypalo
- 2026-present time: A. L. Medvedsky

== Notable scientists (partial list) ==
See also Category:Central Aerohydrodynamic Institute employees

- Sergey Chaplygin
- Anatoly Dorodnitsyn
- Mstislav Keldysh
- Sergei Korolev
- Sergey Khristianovich
- Yuri Ryzhov
- Leonid Shkadov
- Max Taitz
- Vladimir Vetchinkin
