= Zhukovsky, Moscow Oblast =

City in Moscow Oblast, Russia

Zhukovsky Жуковский
- City
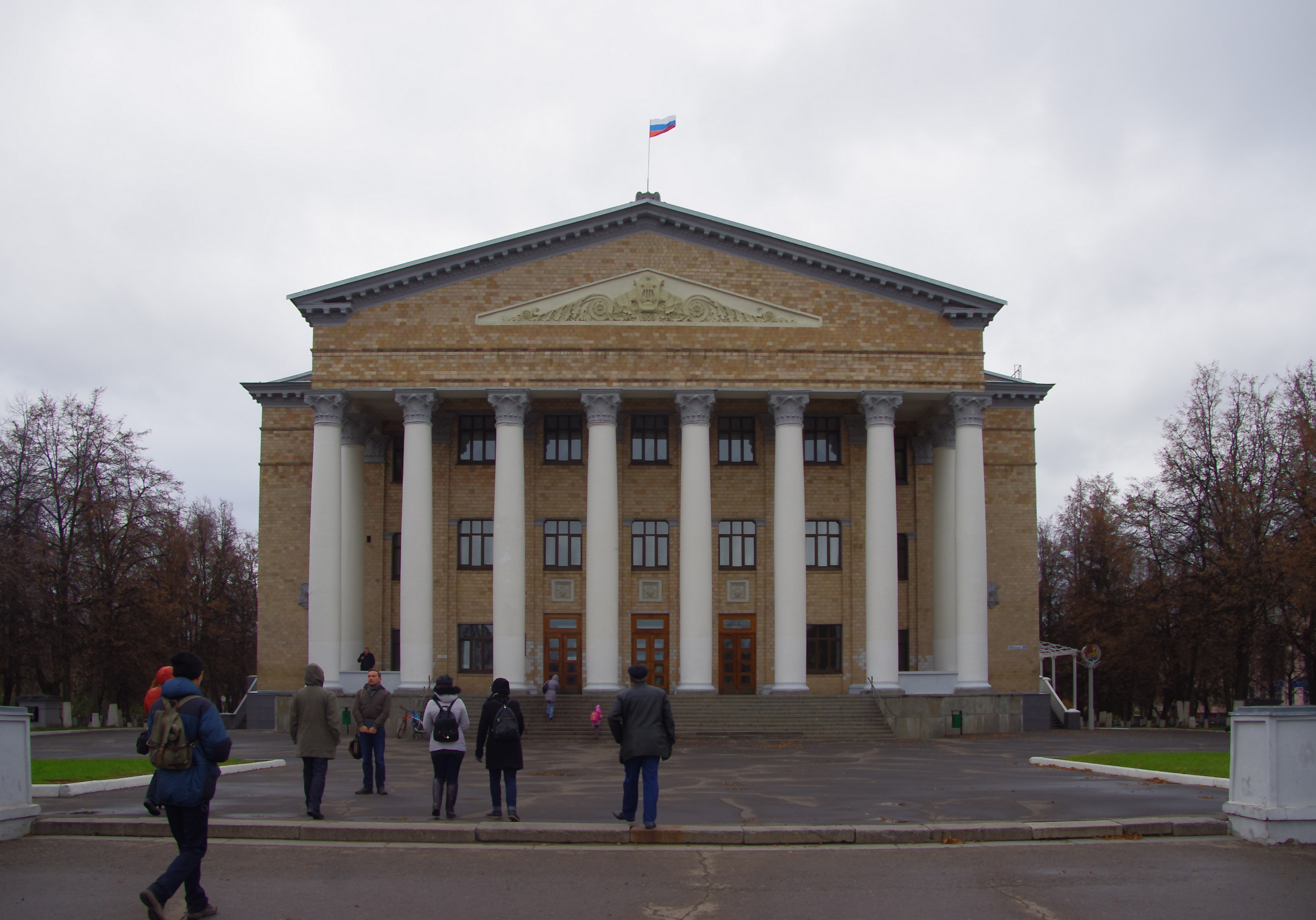
- Zhukovsky Central Square

- Flag Coat of arms
- Interactive map of Zhukovsky
- Location of Zhukovsky Zhukovsky (Moscow Oblast)
- Coordinates: 55°35′50″N 38°07′13″E
- Country: Russia
- Federal subject: Moscow Oblast
- Founded: 1935
- City status since: April 23, 1947

Government
  - Body: Council of Deputies
  - Head: Andrey Voytuk
- Elevation: 130 m (430 ft)

Population (2010 Census)
  - Total: 104,736
  - Estimate (2025): 109,831 (+4.9%)
  - Rank: 154th in 2010

Administrative status
  - Subordinated to: Zhukovsky City Under Oblast Jurisdiction
  - Capital of: Zhukovsky City Under Oblast Jurisdiction

Municipal status
  - Urban okrug: Zhukovsky Urban Okrug
  - Capital of: Zhukovsky Urban Okrug
- Time zone: UTC+3 (MSK)
- Postal code: 140180
- Dialing code: +7 49648
- OKTMO ID: 46725000001
- City Day: Third Sunday of August
- Website: www.zhukovskiy.ru

Zhukovsky (Russian: Жуковский, Russian pronunciation: [ʐʊˈkofskʲɪj]) is a city in Moscow Oblast, Russia, located on the Moskva River, 40 kilometers (25 mi) southeast of Moscow. Population: 104,736 (2010 census); 101,328 (2002 census); 100,609 (1989 Soviet census).

== History ==
The urban-type settlement of Stakhanovo was founded in 1935 from the dacha settlement Otdykh (literally, "Relaxation"). It was named after Alexey Stakhanov, a Russian miner of the Stalinist era. On April 23, 1947, the settlement was granted town status and renamed Zhukovsky, in honor of scientist Nikolay Zhukovsky.

== Administrative and municipal status ==
Within the framework of administrative divisions, it is incorporated as Zhukovsky City Under Oblast Jurisdiction—an administrative unit with the status equal to that of the districts. As a municipal division, Zhukovsky City Under Oblast Jurisdiction is incorporated as Zhukovsky Urban Okrug.

== Research and economy ==
Zhukovsky is a home to the M. M. Gromov Flight Research Institute and N. Ye. Zhukovsky Central Aerohydrodynamic Institute — they are two major facilities involved in testing and designing aircraft. These facilities were employers for a great portion of the city's population before perestroika. Also, there is situated the Aeromechanics faculty of MIPT.

There are a number smaller, but also important enterprises, such as:

- Tikhomirov Scientific Research Institute of Instrument Design (НИИП, NIIP),
- Scientific Research Institute of Avionics (НИИАО, NIIAO),
- Agat Moscow Scientific Research Institute (Агат, Agate),
- Myasishchev Experimental Machine-building Plant (ЭМЗ, EMZ).

The airline Aviastar-TU has its head office in Zhukovsky.

There are also a number of flight testing divisions of the aviation design bureaus (Sukhoy, Ilyushin, Tupolev, etc.) located in the area as well as machine-building plants, paper-mill food industry - Inko, Nestlé, local bread-baking plant.

In 2008, President Vladimir Putin signed a presidential decree establishing the National Aircraft Industry Centre.

== Transport ==
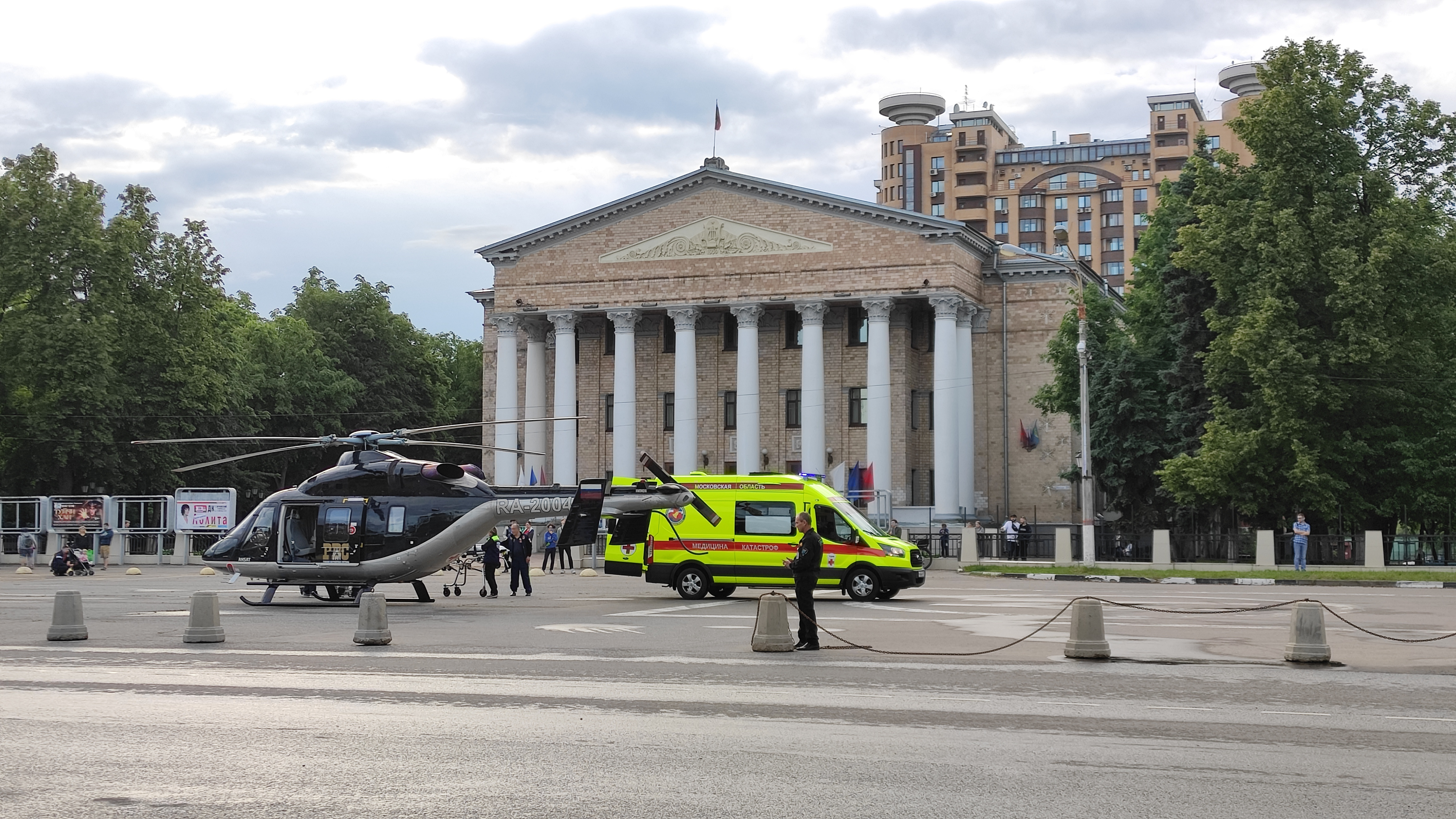
Helipad in Zhukovsky city center

- Zhukovsky International Airport
- Otdykh (Zhukovsky) railway stop
- Bus service to-from Moscow, Ramenskoye
- There is a helipad located at Lenin Square intended for air medical services

== Sports ==
Zhukovsky is the center of track and field athletics in Moscow Oblast. Most notable athletes born in Zhukovsky are Yuriy Borzakovskiy, Yekaterina Podkopayeva, Andrey Yepishin, Dmitry Bogdanov, and others. In 2005, the Meteor international standard athletics stadium was opened.

There was also a bandy club Strela based in Zhukovsky.

== Culture ==
Zhukovsky museum was opened in 1979. It contains a unique collection of pilot's uniform and equipment.

== Twin towns – sister cities ==
Zhukovsky is twinned with:

- Le Bourget, France
- Fangchenggang, China
- Hemet, United States
- Meerut, India
- San Jacinto, United States
- Sydals (Sønderborg), Denmark
- Zhuhai, China

== Notable people ==
- Irina Devina, rhythmic gymnast
- Maria Tolkacheva, rhythmic gymnast
- Viktoria Mullova, concert violinist
- Vladislav Namestnikov, NHL ice hockey player with the Winnipeg Jets
