= Agranovich =

Agranovich is a Jewish surname that may refer to

- Evgeny Agranovich (1918–2010), Russian poet and bard
- Mikhail Agranovich (mathematician) (1931–2017), Russian mathematician
- Mikhail Agranovich (cinematographer) (born 1946), Soviet and Russian cinematographer, director and teacher
- Lev Agranovich (born 1970), Jewish producer and actor, author and accountant
- Sophia Agranovich, Ukrainian-American concert pianist, recording artist and music educator

== See also ==
- Agranovich–Dynin formula
