= Ivan Neumyvakin =

Soviet-Russian physician & scientist (1928–2018)

- Education: Doctor of Sciences in Medicine
- Occupation: Medical doctor
- Employer: Institute of Biomedical Problems
- Awards: Honoured Inventor of the RSFSR (1979); Latvian SSR State Prize (1982)

External image
- Ivan Neumyvakin

External image
- Neumyvakin and Valentina Tereshkova

Ivan Pavlovich Neumyvakin (Russian: Иван Павлович Неумывакин; 7 July 1928, near Bishkek, in a family of displaced Ukrainians, Kyrgyzstan – 22 April 2018, Moscow, Russia) was a Soviet physician, Doctor of Medical Sciences, Professor and Fellow of the Russian Academy of Natural Sciences. Laureate of the 1982 Latvian SSR State Prize and of the 2005 "Profession - Life" International Prize. He is known in Russia as one of the founders of space medicine. He also is known as a healer. He received the honorary titles 1979 "Honoured Inventor of the RSFSR" and the 2006 "The Person of Russia" and the title "Distinguished Healer of the Russia" (Лучший народный целитель России) and the title "Maitre of Science and Practice". He was a popular author. His book Endoecology of health is a best seller. Marie Claire magazine named him "Guru of healthy lifestyle".

== Biography ==
He was born on the family farm. His mother was healer. He graduated from the Kyrgyz State Medical Academy in 1951. He was a surgeon and served for eight years in the Far East. From 1964 until 1989, he worked at the Institute of Medicobiological Problems of the Russian Academy of Sciences. In 1965, he defended his Candidate's Dissertation. He was a student of Boris Evgenyevich Votchal. In 1982, he defended his doctoral dissertation. In 1989, he retired and then he headed his medical Center. His rank is Colonel.

He was vice president of the Russian Association of folk medicine (РАНМ) since 2012. He was the Chairman of the Academic council of this Association after its reorganization. He was a member of the Bureau of the Academic Council of the All-Russian Research Center for Traditional Folk Medicine. He was an assistant to the deputy of the State Duma of the Russian Federation. He was a Member of the Presidium of The 100 Years Club (as well as his friend Nikolay Drozdov).

He also was Academician of the International Informatization Academy and of the European Academy of Natural Sciences and of the Academy of Medical and Technical Sciences and of the International Charity Academy (since 2010).

He was an Honorary Member of the "Generals of the World for Peace" International Association (since 2014). He was given the Medal of this Association in 2016 for peacemaking activities.

I.P. Neumyvakin received the Order of Holy Prince Daniel of Moscow, from Patriarch Alexy II of Moscow.

I.P. Neumyvakin is the author of more than 250 scientific papers. He also is the author about 100 books. He has about 100 inventions.

His wife, Lyudmila Stepanovna, was also a physician.

== Honors and awards ==
- Order of the Badge of Honour (1976)
- Honoured Inventor of the RSFSR (1979)
- Latvian SSR State Prize (1982)
- Yakov Galperin Prize (1993)
- "Profession-Life" International Prize (2005)
- Lieutenant-General, Cossack rank (since 2005)
- "The Person of Russia" of the Year 2006
- "Star of Hope" order and star, I class (2006)
- Order of Holy Prince Daniel of Moscow, III class (200?)
- Honorary Member of the "Generals of the World for Peace" International Association (2014)
- Medal of the "Generals of the World for Peace" International Association (2016)
- Order "For Honor, Valor, Creation, Mercy"
- "Marshal Zhukov" order
- Amber Star Master
