= Dynin =

Dynin may refer to:

- Dynín, a village
- Alexander Dynin, mathematician
