= Kirill Kavokin =

Russian physicist (born 1962)

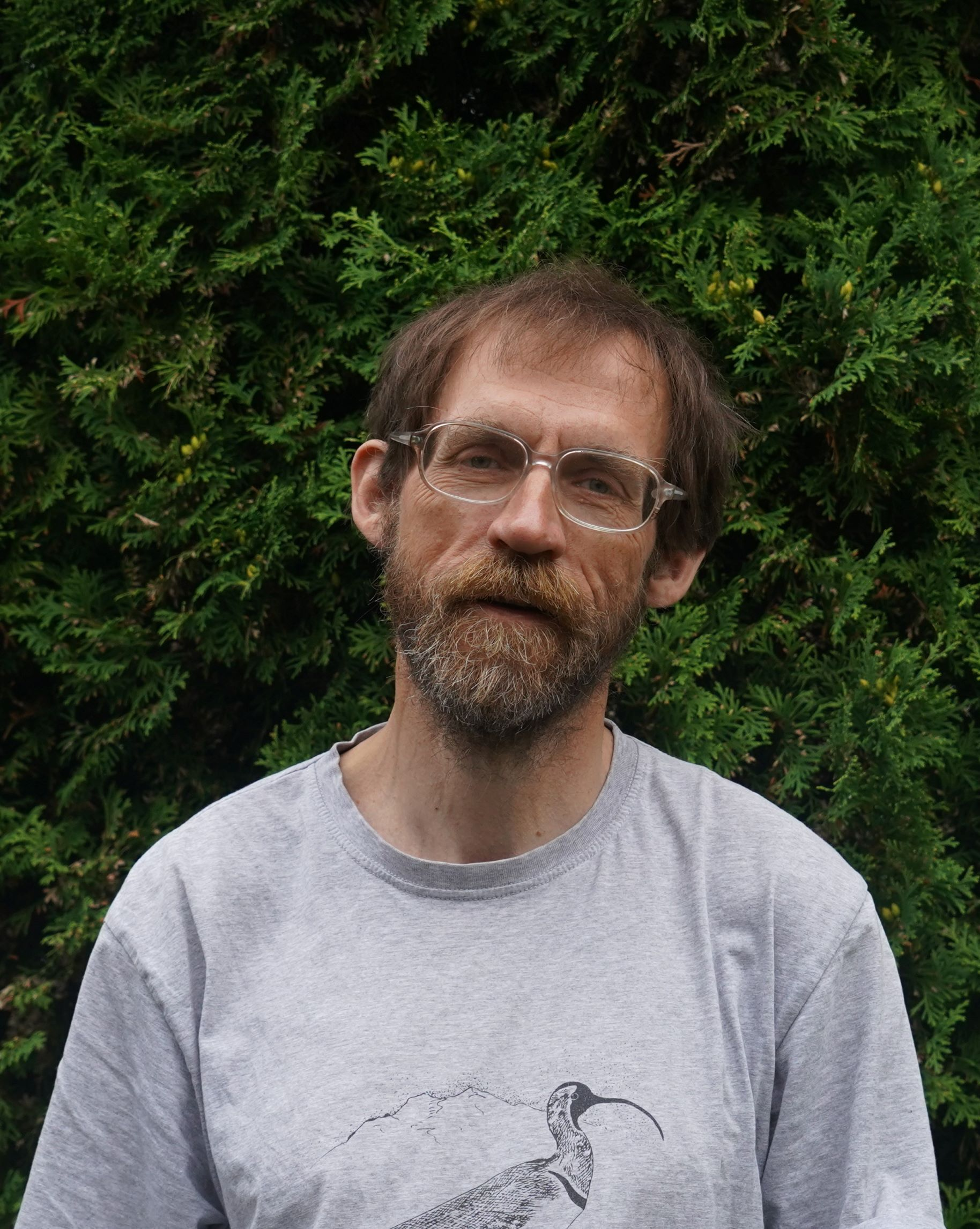
- Dr. Kirill Kavokin, August 2021.
- Born: 26 November 1962 (age 63); Leningrad
- Education: Ioffe Institute
- Spouse: Julia Bojarinova.
- Scientific career
- Fields: Solid State Physics
- Workplaces: Saint Petersburg State University, I. M. Sechenov Institute of Evolutionary Physiology and Biochemistry, Mediterranean Institute of Fundamental Physics
- Thesis: Theory of Free Magnetic Polarons in Quantum Wells with Semimagnetic Barriers. (1993)
- Doctoral advisor: Prof. I.A. Merkulov

Kirill Kavokin (born 26 November 1962 in Leningrad) is a Russian physicist working on solid state physics, semiconductor optics and spin physics. He also works on animal vision and magnetoreception. He is currently leading scientist at the Spin Optics Laboratory (SOLAB) at Saint-Petersburg State University (SPbSU) and at the I. M. Sechenov Institute of Evolutionary Physiology and Biochemistry, in Saint Petersburg, Russia. He is the brother of Physicist Alexey Kavokin.

== Scientific Career ==
- 1985: MS in Optoelectronics, Leningrad Electrical Engineering Institute, Leningrad (St.Petersburg), Russia. Thesis title: "Optical study of GaAs-based photocathode structures", under the supervision of Dr. R.I. Dzhioev.
- 1985–1987: probation fellow at A.F. Ioffe Physico-Technical Institute.
- 1987–1993: Junior researcher at A.F. Ioffe Physico-Technical Institute.
- 1993: Ph.D in Physics, A.F. Ioffe Institute. Thesis title: "Theory of Free Magnetic Polarons in Quantum Wells with Semimagnetic Barriers", under the supervision of Prof. I.A. Merkulov
- 1993–1997: Researcher at A.F. Ioffe Physico-Technical Institute.
- 1997-2018 Senior scientist at A.F. Ioffe Physico-Technical Institute;
- 2002–2003: Research fellow at School of Physics, University of Exeter, UK.
- 2020: Dr. of Science (habilitation), SPbSU. Thesis title: "Relaxation of angular momentum and energy in spin systems of doped semiconductors"

== Publications ==
He is the author or co-author of over 200 peer-reviewed publications, with key works on spin relaxation in semiconductors, which he studies at both a theoretical and experimental level. He also applied his knowledge of magnetic phenomena in solids to the problem of animal magnetoreception, in particular of garden warblers.

Selected publications:

- Braun, P.; Marie, X.; Lombez, L.; Urbaszek, B.; Amand, T.; Renucci, P.; K.Kalevich, V.; V.Kavokin, K.; Krebs, O.; Voisin, P.; Masumoto, Y. (2005). "Direct Observation of the Electron Spin Relaxation Induced by Nuclei in Quantum Dots" (PDF). Phys. Rev. Lett. 94 (11) 116601. Bibcode:2005PhRvL..94k6601B. doi:10.1103/PhysRevLett.94.116601. PMID 15903877.
- Kavokin, K.V. (2001). "Anisotropic exchange interaction of localized conduction-band electrons in semiconductors". Phys. Rev. B. 64 (7) 075305. arXiv:cond-mat/0011340. Bibcode:2001PhRvB..64g5305K. doi:10.1103/PhysRevB.64.075305. S2CID 119368455.
- Dzhioev, R.I.; Kavokin, K.V.; Korenev, V.L.; Lazarev, M.V.; Meltser, B.Ya.; Stepanova, M.N.; Zakharchenya, B.P.; Gammon, D.; Katzer, D.S. (2002). "Low-temperature spin relaxation in n-type GaAs". Phys. Rev. B. 66 (24) 245204. arXiv:cond-mat/0208083. Bibcode:2002PhRvB..66x5204D. doi:10.1103/PhysRevB.66.245204. S2CID 119434938.
- Smirnov, D.S.; Kavokin, K.V. (2020). "Optical resonance shift spin-noise spectroscopy". Phys. Rev. B. 101 (23) 235416. arXiv:2001.09060. Bibcode:2020PhRvB.101w5416S. doi:10.1103/PhysRevB.101.235416. S2CID 210911800.
- Bojarinova, J.; Kavokin, K. (2020). "Magnetic compass of garden warblers is not affected by oscillating magnetic fields applied to their eyes". Scientific Reports. 10 (1): 3473. Bibcode:2020NatSR..10.3473B. doi:10.1038/s41598-020-60383-x. PMC 7044251. PMID 32103061.
