= Anatolie Sidorenko =

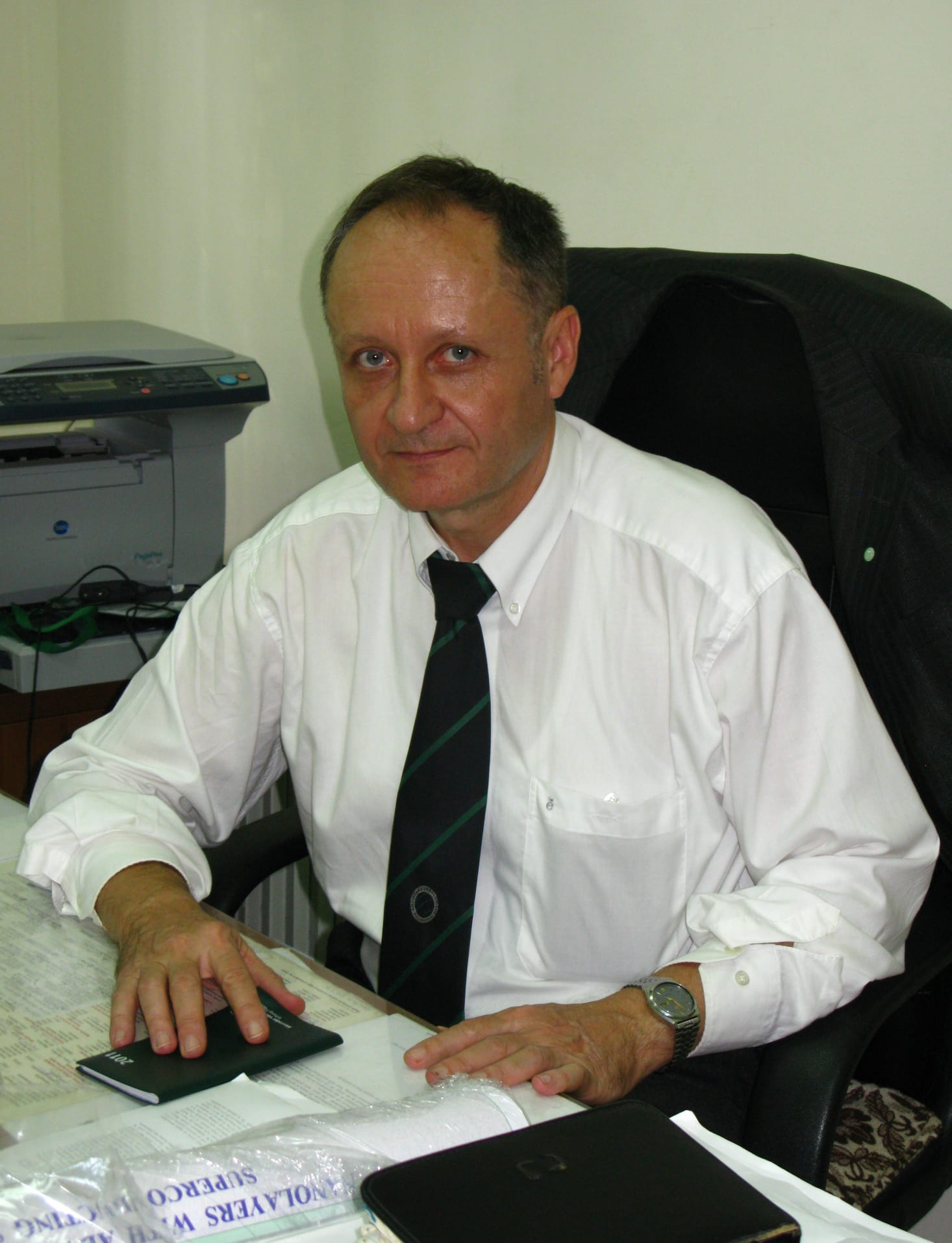
- Born: 15.09.1953; USSR
- Scientific career
- Fields: Condensed matter physics, in particular transport properties of low dimensional and layered superconductors, nonconventional superconductors and FFLO state, proximity and Josephson effect. Superconducting electronic devices and sensors.

Anatolie S. Sidorenko (born September 15, 1953 in Bălți, Moldova) is a doctor of physical and mathematical sciences and professor at the Technical University of Moldova. He specializes in condensed matter physics with the focus on electronic transport and magnetic properties of low dimensional systems – thin films and layered superconductors, design of superconducting devices and sensors. He made key contributions to investigation of novel superconducting materials and hybrid structures superconductor-ferromagnet, multiband and triplet superconductivity.

== Biography ==
Anatolie Sidorenko was born in 1953 in the city of Bălți, Moldova (then part of the Moldavian SSR of the Soviet Union). In 1970 he graduated with gold medal from School 37 with physical-mathematical profile in Chișinău, Moldova.

In 1975 he graduated from Technical University of Moldova, the Electro-Physical Faculty at the Chair of Semiconducting Devices, and became PhD student of the B. Verkin Institute for Low Temperature Physics and Engineering of the National Academy of Sciences of Ukraine in Kharkov, working under supervision of professor Igor Dmitrenko (who was the first detected in 1965 high-frequency radiation of Josephson junctions).

In 1979 he defended PhD thesis "Superconductivity of thin films of vanadium and tantalum" at the Institute for Low Temperature Physics and Engineering in Kharkov, then worked as a researcher at the Institute of Applied Physics of Moldova, Chișinău from 1980 till 1992. In 1981 he worked as postdoc in International Laboratory for Strong Magnetic Fields and Low Temperatures, Wroclaw, Poland; in 1983 – postdoc in the Lounasmaa Laboratory of Low Temperatures, Helsinki University, Finland; in 1987 – postdoc in Tata Institute of Fundamental Research, Mumbai, India. In 1991he got his doctoral degree (Habilitation degree), defended habilitation's work "Superconductivity of structures, based on transition metals and multicomponent systems". In 1992 he won the fellowship of the Alexander von Humboldt Foundation for 2 years scientific work at the University of Karlsruhe, Germany; in 1995 – 1999 worked as a guest scientist at the Institute of Physics at University of Karlsruhe, Germany. In 2000-2003 – as a guest scientist at the Institute of Physics of University of Augsburg, Bavaria, Germany.

In 2004 Anatolie Sidorenko won the State Prize of the Republic of Moldova for the cycle of works "Kinetic processes and cooperative phenomena in electronic materials and nanostructures", returned in Moldova and organized the Laboratory of Superconductivity at the Institute of Applied Physics of Moldavian Academy of Sciences. In 2008 he became director of a new organized Institute of Electronic Engineering and Nanotechnologies of Moldavian Academy of Sciences, developing new strategic direction of investigation – functional nanostructures for superconducting electronics and spintronics.

From 2020 till present Anatolie Sidorenko is a principal investigator of the Institute of Electronic Engineering and Nanotechnologies, and professor at the Faculty of Computers, Informatics and Microelectronics of the Technical University of Moldova.

He was coordinator of several international projects (INTAS, Volkswagen Foundation, A.v.Humboldt Foundation, BMBF, DFG, NATO SfP, FP-7, HORIZON-2020).

Since 2018 A. Sidorenko is coordinator of the collaborative project "SPINTECH" of the HORIZON-2020 program, which is supported by the European Union and coordinates research in superconducting spintronics of three teams – of Stockholm University (Sweden), University of Twente (The Netherlands) and the Institute of Electronic Engineering and Nanotechnologies (Moldova). The aim of the SPINTECH project is to boost the scientific excellence and innovation capacity in the field of spintronics – especially in the development of advanced technologies for design and fabrication of superconducting spin-valves.

In 2001 Anatolie Sidorenko was elected a member of the Deutsche Physikalische Gesellschaft (DPG), and in 2012 – member of the Moldavian Academy of Sciences.

== Memberships ==
- Member of the Deutsche Physikalische Gesellschaft (2001)
- Winner of State Prize of the Republic of Moldova (2004)
- Member of the Moldavian Academy of Sciences (2012)
- Member of the Mediterranean Institute of Fundamental Physics (MIFP), Rom, Italy (2011)
- President of Association of Physicists of Moldova (since 2019).
- President of Humboldt Association of Moldova ("Humboldt-Club Moldova", since 1997)
- Coordinator of the project "SPINTECH" which received funding from the European Union's Horizon 2020 research and innovation programme under grant agreement No 810144 (2018 – 2022)
- Outstanding referee of MDPI journals
- Editorial Board member of the journal "Beilstein Journal of Nanotechnology"
- Editorial Board member of the journal "Electronica"

== Awards ==
- Award of the orden "GLORIA MUNCII" of Moldova Republic (2019)
- "Honored Person of Moldova Republic" (2014)
- Prize of the Academy of Sciences of Moldova for the best scientific results in spintronics (2013)
- Member of the Academy of Sciences of Moldova (2012)
- Special Prize of the Academy of Sciences of Moldova (2011)
- Laureate of the State Prize of the Republic of Moldova (2004)
- "Honored Inventor of the USSR" (1988)
- Laureate of the State Prize "Boris Glavan" for young scientists (1982)

== Selected publications ==
- Sidorenko, Anatolie S (10 November 2020). "Functional nanostructures for electronics, spintronics and sensors". Beilstein Journal of Nanotechnology. 11: 1704–1706. doi:10.3762/bjnano.11.152. PMC 7670112. PMID 33224700.
- Sidorenko, Anatolie, ed. (2018). Functional Nanostructures and Metamaterials for Superconducting Spintronics. NanoScience and Technology. doi:10.1007/978-3-319-90481-8. ISBN 978-3-319-90480-1. S2CID 199490855.
- Sidorenko, Anatolie S (9 March 2017). "Physics, chemistry and biology of functional nanostructures III". Beilstein Journal of Nanotechnology. 8: 590–591. doi:10.3762/bjnano.8.63. PMC 5355908. PMID 28382248.
- Sidorenko, Anatolie (2011). Fundamentals of Superconducting Nanoelectronics. NanoScience and Technology. Bibcode:2011fsn..book.....S. doi:10.1007/978-3-642-20158-5. ISBN 978-3-642-20157-8.
- Klenov, Nikolay; Khaydukov, Yury; Bakurskiy, Sergey; Morari, Roman; Soloviev, Igor; Boian, Vladimir; Keller, Thomas; Kupriyanov, Mikhail; Sidorenko, Anatoli; Keimer, Bernhard (9 April 2019). "Periodic Co/Nb pseudo spin valve for cryogenic memory". Beilstein Journal of Nanotechnology. 10: 833–839. doi:10.3762/bjnano.10.83. PMC 6466729. PMID 31019870.
- Sidorenko, A. S. (July 2017). "Reentrance phenomenon in superconductor/ferromagnet nanostructures and their application in superconducting spin valves for superconducting electronics". Low Temperature Physics. 43 (7): 766–771. Bibcode:2017LTP....43..766S. doi:10.1063/1.4995623.
- Lenk, D.; Morari, R.; Zdravkov, V. I.; Ullrich, A.; Khaydukov, Yu.; Obermeier, G.; Müller, C.; Sidorenko, A. S.; von Nidda, H.-A. Krug; Horn, S.; Tagirov, L. R.; Tidecks, R. (27 November 2017). "Full-switching FSF-type superconducting spin-triplet magnetic random access memory element". Physical Review B. 96 (18) 184521. Bibcode:2017PhRvB..96r4521L. doi:10.1103/PhysRevB.96.184521.
- Antropov, E; Kalenkov, M S; Kehrle, J; Zdravkov, V I; Morari, R; Socrovisciuc, A; Lenk, D; Horn, S; Tagirov, L R; Zaikin, A D; Sidorenko, A S; Hahn, Horst; Tidecks, R (1 August 2013). "Experimental and theoretical analysis of the upper critical field in ferromagnet–superconductor–ferromagnet trilayers". Superconductor Science and Technology. 26 (8) 085003. arXiv:1302.0644. Bibcode:2013SuScT..26h5003A. doi:10.1088/0953-2048/26/8/085003. S2CID 118374918.
- Morari, R.; Zdravkov, V.; Antropov, E.; Sidorenko, A. (1 December 2012). "Nanolayers with Advanced Properties for Superconducting Spintronics". Journal of Nanoelectronics and Optoelectronics. 7 (7): 678–680. doi:10.1166/jno.2012.1417.
- Taylan Koparan, E.; Surdu, A.; Awawdeh, A.; Sidorenko, A.; Yanmaz, E. (August 2012). "Artificial Pinning Centers on MgB2 Superconducting Thin Films Coated by FeO Nanoparticles". Journal of Superconductivity and Novel Magnetism. 25 (6): 1761–1767. doi:10.1007/s10948-012-1533-1. S2CID 254704011.
- Palistrant, M.; Surdu, A.; Ursu, V.; Petrenko, P.; Sidorenko, A. (June 2011). "Analytical solutions of the microscopic two-band theory for the temperature dependence of the upper critical fields of pure MgB 2 compared with experimental data". Low Temperature Physics. 37 (6): 451–458. Bibcode:2011LTP....37..451P. doi:10.1063/1.3610174.
- Surdu, Andrei E; Hamdeh, Hussein H; Al-Omari, Imad A; Sellmyer, David J; Socrovisciuc, Alexei V; Prepelita, Andrei A; Koparan, Ezgi T; Yanmaz, Ekrem; Ryazanov, Valery V; Hahn, Horst; Sidorenko, Anatolie S (14 December 2011). "Enhancement of the critical current density in FeO-coated MgB 2 thin films at high magnetic fields". Beilstein Journal of Nanotechnology. 2: 809–813. doi:10.3762/bjnano.2.89. PMC 3257506. PMID 22259764.
- Karminskaya, T. Yu.; Golubov, A. A.; Kupriyanov, M. Yu.; Sidorenko, A. S. (18 June 2010). "Josephson effect in superconductor/ferromagnet structures with a complex weak-link region". Physical Review B. 81 (21) 214518. Bibcode:2010PhRvB..81u4518K. doi:10.1103/PhysRevB.81.214518.
- Straumal, B. B.; Baretzky, B.; Kogtenkova, O. A.; Straumal, A. B.; Sidorenko, A. S. (April 2010). "Wetting of grain boundaries in Al by the solid Al3Mg2 phase". Journal of Materials Science. 45 (8): 2057–2061. Bibcode:2010JMatS..45.2057S. doi:10.1007/S10853-009-4014-6. S2CID 56000961.
- Sidorenko, A. S.; Zdravkov, V. I.; Kehrle, J.; Morari, R.; Obermeier, G.; Gsell, S.; Schreck, M.; Müller, C.; Kupriyanov, M. Yu.; Ryazanov, V. V.; Horn, S.; Tagirov, L. R.; Tidecks, R. (September 2009). "Quasi-one-dimensional Fulde-Ferrell-Larkin-Ovchinnikov-like state in Nb/Cu0.41Ni0.59 bilayers". JETP Letters. 90 (2): 139–142. Bibcode:2009JETPL..90..139S. doi:10.1134/S0021364009140124. S2CID 121445782.
- Sidorenko, A S; Zdravkov, V; Kehrle, J; Morari, R; Obermeier, G; Gsell, S; Schreck, M; Müller, C; Ryazanov, V; Horn, S; Tagirov, L R; Tidecks, R (1 March 2009). "Double re-entrance of superconductivity in superconductor/ferromagnet bilayers". Journal of Physics: Conference Series. 150 (5) 052242. Bibcode:2009JPhCS.150e2242S. doi:10.1088/1742-6596/150/5/052242. S2CID 250690991. ProQuest 2580232060.
- Sidorenko, A.; Zdravkov, V.; Ryazanov, V.; Horn, S.; Klimm, S.; Tidecks, R.; Wixforth, A.; Koch, Th.; Schimmel, Th. (June 2005). "Thermally assisted flux flow in MgB 2: strong magnetic field dependence of the activation energy". Philosophical Magazine. 85 (16): 1783–1790. arXiv:cond-mat/0406062. Bibcode:2005PMag...85.1783S. doi:10.1080/14786430500036678. S2CID 98474527.
- Grigore, D.R.; Scharf, G. (27 March 2003). "A supersymmetric extension of quantum gauge theory". Annalen der Physik. 515 (1–2): 5–36. doi:10.1002/andp.200310005. S2CID 120311410.
