= Polukhin =

Polukhin (Russian: Полухин) is a Russian masculine surname, its feminine counterpart is Polukhina. It may refer to

- Alexander Polukhin (born 1988), Russian ice hockey player
- Nikolay Polukhin (born 1982), Russian Paralympic cross-country skier and biathlete
- Valentina Polukhina (1936–2022), British-Russian scholar
- Vladimir Polukhin (1932–2009), Russian scientist and engineer
