= Cheburkin =

Cheburkin (or Tchebourkine) is a Russian surname. There is also a feminine form for the surname.

- Ivan Nikolaevich Cheburkin (1911–1977) — athlete, champion of the USSR in the marathon, participant in the Great Patriotic War, guard foreman, full holder of the Order of Glory.
- Nikolay Vsevolodovich Cheburkin (1941–2021) — scientist and inventor, author of scientific patents, articles and publications, laureate of State Prizes of the USSR and Russian Federation, Honoured Scientist of the Russian Federation, Doctor of Physical and Mathematical Sciences (Doctor Nauk), Professor.
- Marina Tchebourkina (born in 1965) — Russian-French organist and musicologist, Doctor of Science (Doctor Nauk) in Science of the Arts.
