= Mikhail Agranovich =

Mikhail Agranovich may refer to:

- Mikhail Agranovich (mathematician) (1931–2017), Russian mathematician
- Mikhail Agranovich (cinematographer) (born 1946), Soviet and Russian cinematographer, director and teacher
