= Nikolay Cheburkin =

Russian scientist and inventor (1941–2021)

- Николай Всеволодович Чебуркин
- Born: Nikolay Vsevolodovich Cheburkin; May 3, 1941; Orsk, Orenburg Oblast
- Died: December 20, 2021 (aged 80); Moscow
- Resting place: Troyekurovskoye Cemetery, Moscow
- Citizenship: Russia
- Education: Lomonosov Moscow State University - Faculty of Physics
- Known for: numerous scientific patents
- Awards: USSR State Prize, State Prize of the Russian Federation, Medal "Veteran of Labour", Medal "In Commemoration of the 850th Anniversary of Moscow"
- Scientific career
- Fields: laser physics
- Workplaces: NPO Astrofizika, OKB Granat, MIREA - Russian Technological University

Nikolay Vsevolodovich Cheburkin (Russian: Николай Всеволодович Чебуркин; May 3, 1941, Orsk, Orenburg Oblast – December 20, 2021, Moscow) was a Russian scientist and inventor in the field of laser physics. He was the head of various research institutes and companies depending on the Ministry of Defence of the Russian Federation.

Cheburkin was a Doctor of Sciences (Doktor nauk) in physical and mathematical sciences, as well as a professor. Throughout his career, his work was awarded numerous state prizes: the USSR State Prize, the Prize of the Council of Ministers of the Soviet Union, the State Prize of the Russian Federation. He was also an Honored Scientist of the Russian Federation, an Honoured Inventor of the RSFSR and a member of the Russian Academy of Engineering.

Cheburkin is the author of numerous scientific patents, articles and publications.

== Biography ==
Cheburkin was born born in Orsk, Orenburg Oblast, into a family of doctors and teachers. He later moved to Moscow to complete graduate studies in physics. In 1964, he graduated from the Moscow Power Engineering Institute with a degree in Applied Physical Optics. From 1964 to 1966, he worked at KB IVIS (Zelenograd, Moscow), and from 1967 to 1970 at Vympel NPO (Moscow). During this period, he was a PhD student at Lomonosov Moscow State University (1966–1969), and an engineer at Lomonosov University until 1970.

In 1970, he started working at NPO Astrofizika, first as a team supervisor, before attaining the position of deputy general director of research, and later becoming the head and chief designer of the Granat Design Bureau.

In 1993, he became general director of the Federal State Unitary Enterprise "V.K. Orlov Granat High-Energy Laser Design Bureau". In parallel, he headed the department of high-power lasers at MIREA - Russian Technological University.

Cheburkin trained several dozen specialists in the fields of laser physics and laser technologies.

Collaborators, colleagues: N. D. Ustinov, V. K. Orlov, P. V. Zarubin, I. N. Matveev.

== Businesses and positions ==
- OKB Granat for high-energy lasers: general director, general engineer-constructor
- State Scientific Center for Laser Systems of the Russian Federation Astrofizika: chief engineer-constructor, head of the Center for Joint Projects

== Academic degrees and titles ==
- 1987: Doctor of Physical and Mathematical Sciences (Doctor nauk)
- 1990: Professor

== Awards, Prizes ==
- 1978: Laureate of the USSR State Prize
- 1990: Medal "Veteran of Labor"
- 1997: Medal "In Commemoration of the 850th Anniversary of Moscow"
- 2000: Laureate of the State Prize of the Russian Federation
