= Sayakhat Airlines =

Airline of Kazakhstan

Sayakhat
IATA	ICAO	Call sign
—	SAH	SAYAKHAT
- Founded: 1989
- Ceased operations: 2012
- Hubs: Almaty International Airport
- Headquarters: Almaty, Kazakhstan
- Website: http://www.sayakhat.kz/

Sayakhat Airlines or Sayakhat Air Company (Russian: Aвиационная Компания «Саяхат») was an airline based in Almaty, Kazakhstan. It operated chartered cargo and passenger flights out of Almaty International Airport.

== History ==
The airline was founded in 1989 by Vladimir Kouropatenko and Nikolai Alexeyevich Kuznetsov as the first private airline company in Kazakhstan. Flight operations started in 1991.

== Fleet ==
The Sayakhat Airlines fleet included the following aircraft:

- 4 Ilyushin Il-76TD
- 3 Tupolev Tu-154M
