= Nikolai Kuznetsov (pilot) =

Soviet, and later, Kazakhstani aviator

Director of the Kazakh Soviet Socialist Republic Administration of Civil Aviation

Personal details
- Born: December 19, 1922 Novokarpovka, Kirghiz Autonomous Socialist Soviet Republic, RSFSR
- Died: August 12, 2009 (aged 86) Alma-Ata, Kazakhstan
- Profession: Aviator
- Awards: Hero of Socialist Labor (twice)

Military service
- Branch/service: Soviet Armed Forces
- Years of service: 1941–1947
- Commands: Soviet Air Forces
- Battles/wars: World War II

Nikolai Alekseyevich Kuznetsov (Russian: Николай Алексеевич Кузнецов; 19 December 1922 —12 August 2009) was a Soviet, and later, Kazakhstani aviator. Kuznetsov served in the Soviet Armed Forces during World War II, and later went on to serve as the director of the Kazakh SSR's Administration of Civil Aviation. Kuznetsov has been called the "father of Kazakhstani aviation".

== Early life ==
Nikolai Kuznetsov was born in the village of Novokarpovka, in the Nura District of the Karaganda region of the Kazakh Soviet Socialist Republic.

His father, Aleksey, died when Nikolai was thirteen. Nikolay had to work hard to help his mother Aleksandra with the sowing, harvesting, courtship of livestock, and caring for the rest of the family. His younger siblings were Anna, Maria, Marina, Katerina, Olga and Grigoriy. At the same time he studied well in high school. In one of his interviews with the newspaper "Evening Almaty", he said:

My family - simple rural workers formed my views, outlook, based on love and desire to work. All that stays with me through all my life. My parents taught me – You must work hard. Nothing in this life is given for granted. To achieve something you need to put all of yourself, you must put all your soul into it.

== World War II ==
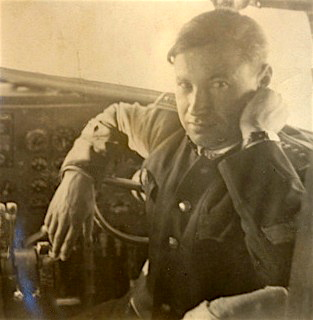
Pilot Nikolai Kuznetsov, Li-2 airplane (1951, Kazakh Soviet Socialist Republic)

Upon the outbreak of Operation Barbarossa, Kuznetsov served in the Red Army. He graduated from military school as a pilot in 1942. After being chosen to receive further training in 1943, Kuznetsov began working as a pilot instructor for the Red Army. During this period, Kuznetsov also participated in a number of tasks and battles, such as an operation in the city of Magnitogorsk to eliminate Otto Skorzeny, and his division of Hitler's army. Skorzeny's plan was to destroy a steel factory, which produced ammunition for the Red Army. Soviet forces were able to neutralize Skorzeny's attempt, though Skorzeny himself managed to escape.

== Post-war career ==
After completion of his military service in 1947, he became a pilot in the Akmola airport in Kazakh Soviet Socialist Republic. A year later he was promoted to the director of the airport.

In 1963 Nikolay Kuznetsov was sent to the department of the Kazakh civil aviation in the position of deputy chief of the flight services. Seven years later in 1970 he became director of the department.

During his tenure, the Civil Aviation of Kazakhstan won acclaim for being equipped with advanced aviation technology and better disciplined personnel than other Soviet counterparts. By the early 1980s more than one hundred thousand kilometers of air lines were opened in Kazakhstan. The capital of Kazakh SSR Alma-Ata was linked to all the capitals of Soviet republics. Also, Alma-ata was linked with all regional centers of Kazakhstan and various major cities and resort areas of the Soviet Union. More than fifty percent of Kazakhstan's population each year used these air transport services of Aeroflot Soviet Airlines. Up to fifteen million hectares of farmland were served by agricultural special airplanes. Seventeen airports were built during this time, as well as ten airports having their own hotels. The administration used the An-24, An-26, An-30, Il-18, Il-62, Il-86, Tu-134, Tu-154, Yak-40, Mi-2, and Mi-8 models of planes, requiring pilots and other aviation personnel to undergo specialized training. One out of every seventh employee of the technical aviation base had engineering degree. The Academy of Civil Aviation was founded in Alma-Ata. At the same time the Flight School was founded in Aktobe. The Ministry of Civil Aviation of the USSR founded a flight operations school in Burunday village. With the development of new aircraft in Domodedovo and Sheremetyevo airports in Moscow the flight personnel of Kazakhstan were predominantly selected.

== Later life ==
In 1989, Nikolai Kuznetsov, along with Vladimir Kouropatenko, founded Sayakhat Airlines, the first private airline in the Kazakh SSR. The airline commenced operations on June 30, 1991. Kuznetsov was chairman of the company, and a member of board of directors. During this time he was elected as a member of the government nonprofit civil aviation veteran organization. In addition he was a member of the Advisory Board of the Department of Transportation of Kazakhstan. Also he was involved in multiple social activities. He gave lectures in different Universities of Kazakhstan, which included many patriotic themes.

== Personal life ==
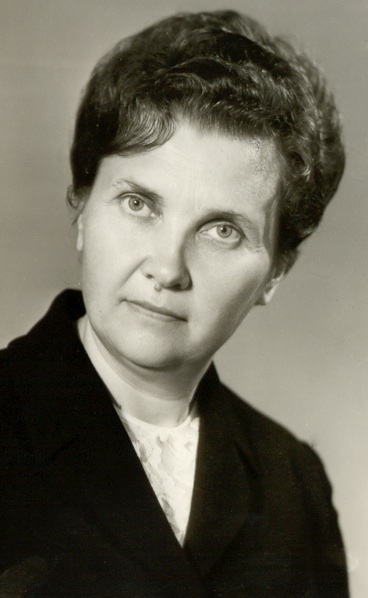
Antonina Dmitrievna Kuznetsova (1970s, Alma-Ata)

Nikolai Kuznetsov was married to Antonina Dmitievna Kuznetsova (August 28, 1924 – November 25, 2008) for over fifty years. She was born with the surname Bedanov in the Stavropol region of the Russian SSR. In her early childhood she moved with her parents, and two younger sisters to Baku, Azerbaijan. She graduated from the Medical Institute of Baku with a medical degree. Antonina worked in Akmola as a physician, and met Nikolai after he flew there in 1949. She continued her medical studies in Alma-Ata where she became an OB/GYN doctor.

Nikolai and Kuznetsov settled in Alma-Ata in the early 1950s. Here they raised their two daughters, a grandson and two granddaughters.

== Awards ==
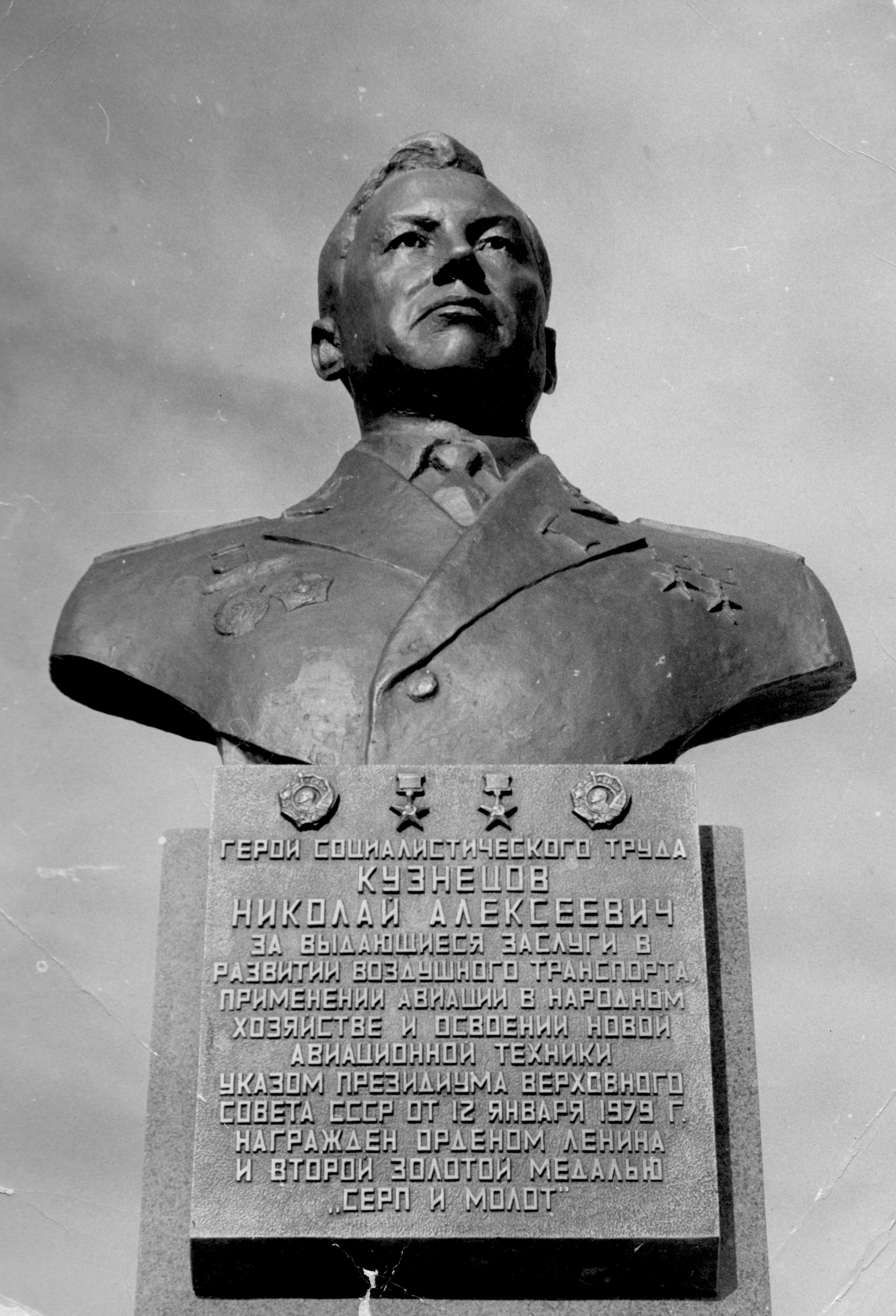
Kuznetsov's monument (Novokarpovka village, Astana region, Kazakhstan)

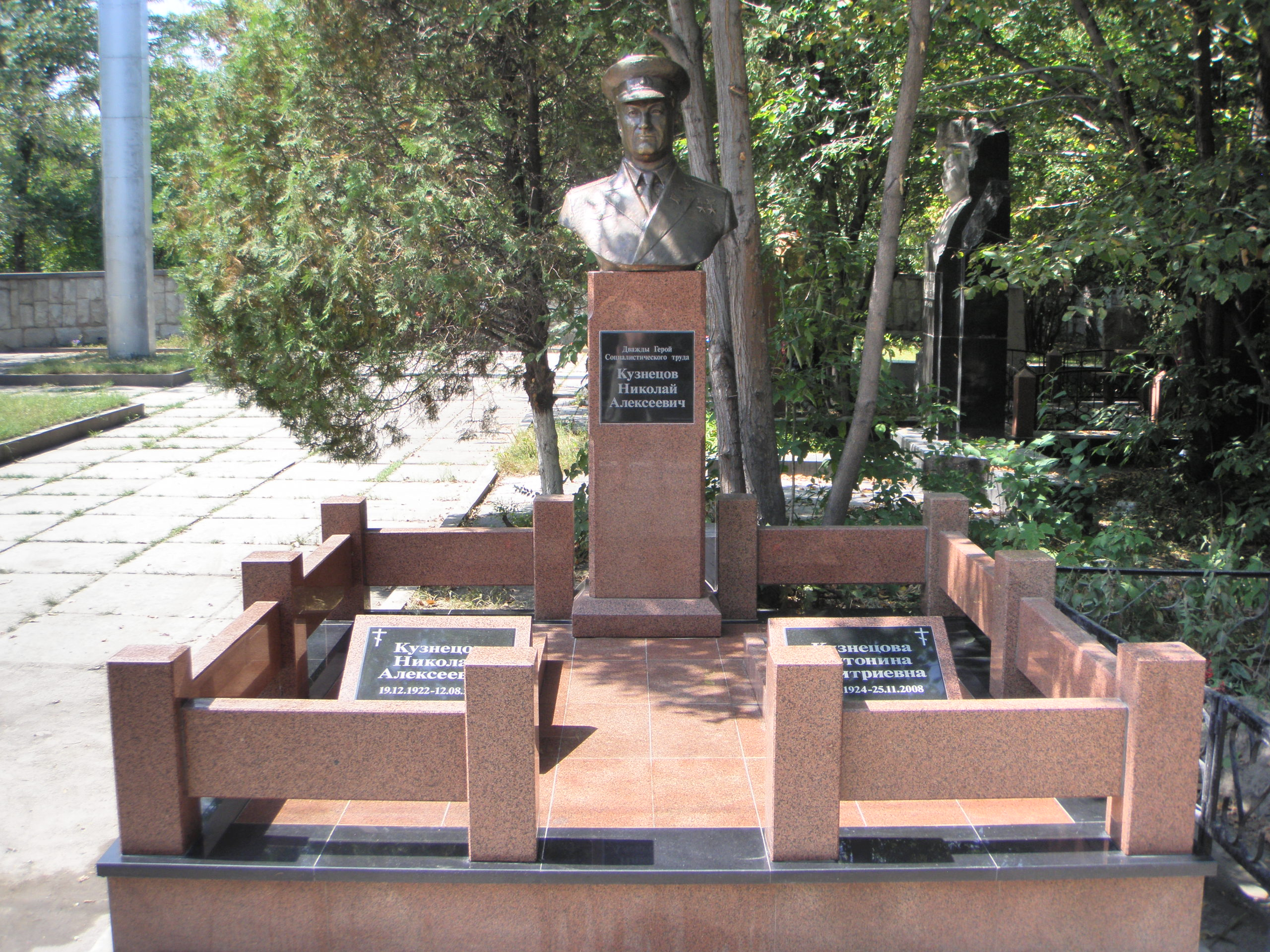
Kuznetsov's monument. Alley of Heroes (August 12, 2010, Tashkenskaya Cemetery, Almaty)

- Twice Hero of Socialist Labour
- Two Orders of Lenin
- Order of the Red Banner of Labour
- Medal "Veteran of Labour"

A bronze monument in his homeland by the Presidium of the Supreme Soviet. In the 1980s Kuznetsov was awarded the Council of Ministers of the Soviet Union, and he was elected as a deputy of the Supreme Soviet of the Kazakh Soviet Socialist Republic.

== Books ==
"Helm and Course" - an autobiography with contributions from more than 300 people, such as Dinmukhamed Kunaev, Leonid Brezhnev, Mikhail Gorbachev, and Boris Bugayev, among others.
