= Medal "Veteran of Labour" =

Civilian labour award of the Soviet Union

- Medal "Veteran of Labour" (obverse)
- Type: Civilian long service medal
- Awarded for: A long and distinguished career
- Presented by: USSR
- Eligibility: Citizens of the Soviet Union
- Status: No longer awarded
- Established: January 18, 1974

Highlights
- Total: 39,197,100
- Ribbons of the Medal "Veteran of Labour"

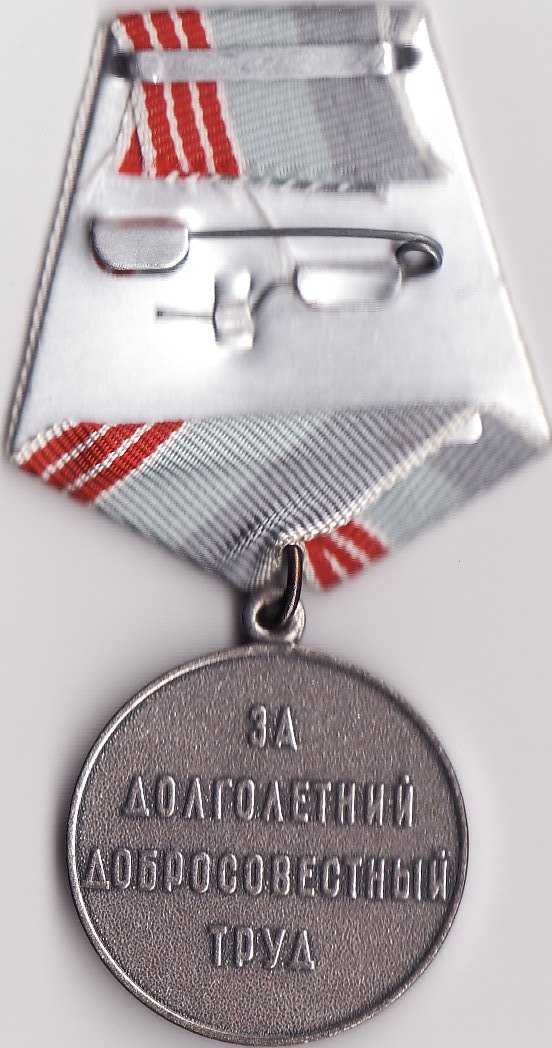
Reverse of the Medal "Veteran of Labour"

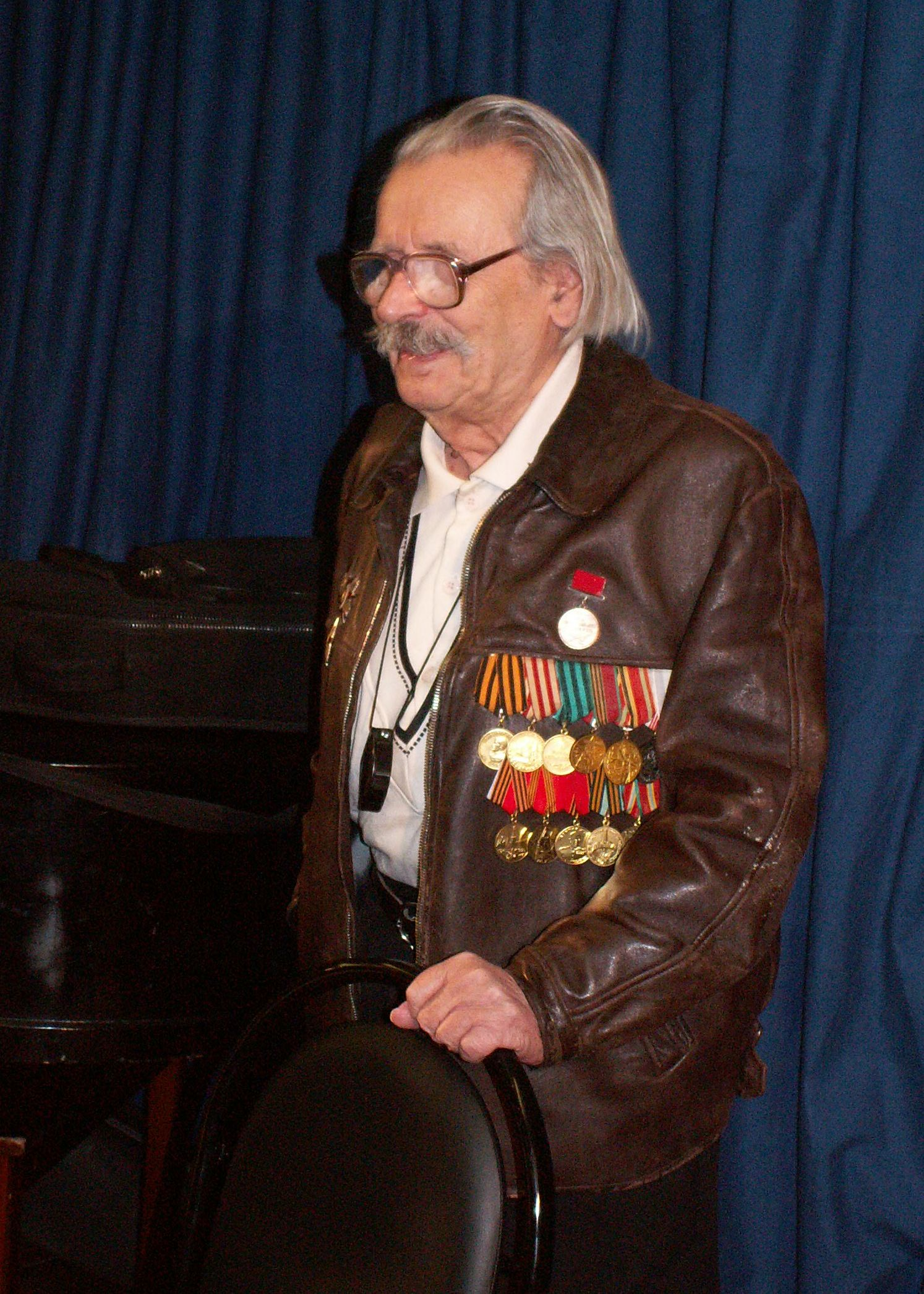
Poet and bard Evgeny Agranovich, a recipient of the Medal "Veteran of Labour"

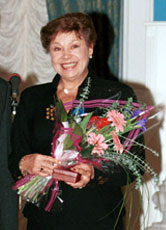
Nine time Olympic gold medalist Larisa Latynina, a recipient of the Medal "Veteran of Labour"

The Medal "Veteran of Labour" (Russian: медаль «Ветеран труда», romanized: medal «Veteran truda») was a civilian labour award of the Soviet Union established on January 18, 1974, by Decree of the Presidium of the Supreme Soviet of the USSR to honour workers for many years of hard work in the national economy, sciences, culture, education, healthcare, government agencies and public organisations. Although it only had a relatively short eighteen years of existence, it was awarded nearly forty million times. Its regulations were detailed and approved by decree number 5999-VIII of May 20, 1974. Its statute was amended by multiple successive decrees of the Presidium of the Supreme Soviet of the USSR, first on June 8, 1977, then on August 12, 1983 and lastly on December 28, 1987. The medal ceased to be awarded following the December 1991 dissolution of the Soviet Union.

== Medal statute ==
The Medal "Veteran of Labour" was awarded to workers for many years of hard work in the national economy, sciences, culture, education, healthcare, government agencies and public organisations. The medal was awarded to workers, farmers and employees in recognition of their lifelong labour on reaching the seniority required for a long-service pension or retirement age. Decree of the Presidium of the Supreme Soviet of the USSR number 5822-IX of June 8, 1977 added the rank and file and the officers of the Ministry of Internal Affairs as potential recipients under the same award criteria as the labourers mentioned in the August 12, 1983 decree.

Recommendations for award were made jointly by administrators of Party and trade union organisations, enterprises, institutions and organisations based on nominations from working groups or workforce councils. The list of potential recipients was then forwarded to municipal, district, or Party and government bodies for final approval. In the case of members of the Ministry of Internal Affairs, the list of nominations was forwarded to the Minister of Internal Affairs for final approval.

Award ceremonies of the Medal "Veteran of Labour" usually took place in the work place of the recipients and were made on behalf of the Presidium of the Supreme Soviet of the USSR, Presidium of the Supreme Soviet of the Union or of Autonomous Republics, the executive committees of regional and provincial Soviets, Moscow Soviet, Leningrad Soviet, or of the city Soviets of People's Deputies of the capitals of Soviet republics.

The Medal "Veteran of Labour" was worn on the left side of the chest and in the presence of other medals of the USSR, immediately after the Medal "For Valiant Labour in the Great Patriotic War 1941-1945". If worn in the presence of awards of the Russian Federation, the latter have precedence. Each medal came with an attestation of award, this attestation came in the form of a small 8 cm by 11 cm cardboard booklet bearing the award's name, the recipient's particulars and an official stamp and signature on the inside.

== Medal description ==
The Medal "Veteran of Labour" was designed by artist SA Pomansky. It was a 34 mm in diameter circular medal struck from tombac and then silver-plated and oxidised. The obverse of the medal bears the relief image of the hammer and sickle over the inscription "USSR" (Russian: «СССР») with diverging rays, a laurel branch spans the width of the obverse from right to left passing under the sickle's handle in an upward curve, along the lower and right circumference, a ribbon bearing the relief inscription "VETERAN OF LABOUR" (Russian: «ВЕТЕРАН ТРУДА»). The otherwise plain reverse bears the inscription on four lines "FOR LONG DILIGENT WORK" (Russian: «ЗА ДОЛГОЛЕТНИЙ ДОБРОСОВЕСТНЫЙ ТРУД»).

The Medal "Veteran of Labour" was secured by a ring through the medal suspension loop to a standard Soviet pentagonal mount covered by a 24mm wide overlapping silk moiré ribbon with 1 mm wide white edge stripes and coloured from left to right by a 7 mm wide dark grey stripe, an 8 mm wide light grey stripe, and three 2 mm wide red stripes separated by two 0.5 mm wide white stripes.

Apparently, there is a variation of the medal, being struck in silver as opposed to tombac, but this has not yet been verified.

== Recipients (partial list) ==
The individuals below were all recipients of the Medal "Veteran of Labour".

- Mamed Aliyev, railway station chief
- Yury Abramovich, test pilot
- Evgeny Agranovich, poet and bard
- Zair Azgur, sculptor
- Sergey Afanasyev, engineer
- Sopubek Begaliev, economist
- Vyacheslav Boguslayev, aero engine engineer
- Elina Bystritskaya, actress
- Yevgeny Vesnik, actor
- Valentin Glushko, rocket engine designer
- Peter Grushin, rocket scientist
- Zara Dolukhanova, mezzo-soprano singer
- Georgiy Zhzhonov, actor and writer
- Vladimir Zeldin, actor
- Viktor Zubkov, former Prime Minister of Russia
- Lyudmila Zykina, folk singer
- Joseph Kobzon, singer
- Quddus Khojamyarov, People's Artist of the USSR and composer
- Nikolai Kuznetsov, director of civil aviation
- Larisa Latynina, gymnast and Olympic medalist
- Olga Lepeshinskaya, ballerina
- Nina Menshikova, actress
- Georg Myasnikov, historian
- Taisiya Sergeevna Osintseva, professor of neurology
- Victor Pavlov, actor
- Vladimir Polukhin, scientist and optics engineer
- Vitaly Popkov, twice Hero of the Soviet Union
- Alexander Prokhorov, physicist
- Mikhail Pugovkin, comic actor
- Valeriy Pustovoitenko, former Ukrainian Prime Minister
- Jamol Rahmatova, ophthalmologist
- Yevgeny Samoylov, actor
- Andrei Sakharov, Nobel Peace Prize winner
- Petr Shelokhonov, actor
- Nikita Simonyan, football player
- Lyudmila Sorokina, museum director
- Zukhra Valeeva, master builder
- Valentin Yanin, historian
- Röstäm Yaxin, composer and pianist

== See also ==
- Orders, decorations, and medals of the Soviet Union
- Badges and Decorations of the Soviet Union
