= Jamol Rahmatova =

Soviet Tajik ophthalmologist

- Ҷамол Шарифовна Раҳматова
- Born: 7 September 1938; Khorog, Tajik SSR, Soviet Union
- Died: 17 January 2019 (aged 80)
- Occupations: Ophthalmologist; politician
- Spouse: Charogabdol Shabdolov
- Children: 3
- Awards: Badge "Excellence in Healthcare of the USSR" (1977); Medal "Veteran of Labour" (1988)

Academic background
- Education: Avicenna Tajik State Medical University

Academic work
- Discipline: Ophthalmology
- Institutions: Regional Eye Hospital; Karamkhudo Yelchibekov Regional Hospital

Member of the Gorno-Badakhshan Autonomous Oblast Soviet of Workers' Deputies
- In office 1971–1973

Jamol Sharifovna Rahmatova (Tajik: Ҷамол Шарифовна Раҳматова, romanized: Çamol Şarifovna Rahmatova; 7 September 1938 – 17 January 2019) was a Soviet Tajik ophthalmologist and politician. She served as chief physician of the Regional Eye Hospital (1974–1986) and the Karamkhudo Yelchibekov Regional Hospital, both in Khorog, as well as the Gorno-Badakhshan Autonomous Oblast Soviet of Workers' Deputies (1971–1973).

== Biography ==
=== Early life and education ===
Rahmatova was born on 7 September 1938 in Khorog, then part of the Gorno-Badakhshan Autonomous Oblast in the Tajik Soviet Socialist Republic. Her parents were Sharif Rahmatov, who was second secretary of the Gorno–Badakshan Regional Committee of the Communist Party of the Tajikistan and chair of the executive committee of the Gorno-Badakhshan Autonomous Oblast Soviet, and Mahtob Yusufova.

Rahmatova was educated at the Russian group of Secondary School No. 3 in Khorog and the Avicenna Tajik State Medical University (ATSMU), studying at the medical faculty. In November 1970, she returned to ATSMU to complete a specialized course in adult tuberculosis, finishing in February 1971 and obtaining a Diploma of Specialist degree in eye disease in August 1971.

=== Career ===
Rahmatova was a phthisiologist at the Regional Anti-Tuberculosis Dispensary in GBAO from 1965 to 1971. In 1971, she joined the Regional Trachomatosis Dispensary as an ophthalmologist, remaining until 1974. In May 1974, the GBAO Oblast Executive Committee's department of health hired Rahmatova as the chief physician of the Regional Eye Hospital in Khorog. She also served as the chief physician of the Karamkhudo Yelchibekov Regional Hospital in Khorog. Centrasia said that she "made a huge contribution to the development of the ophthalmological service and to improving the organization of dispensary observation of patients throughout Gorno-Badakhshan".

In June 1970, Rahmatova was approved for membership in the Communist Party of the Soviet Union, receiving party membership card no. 02933448 on 21 May 1973. She served in the Soviet of Workers' Deputies of the GBAO from 1971 to 1973. She also held leadership positions in the GBAO health department, including three-time secretary of the primary organization and, starting in 1988, deputy secretary of the executive party committee.

Rahmatova received the Badge "Excellence in Healthcare of the USSR" (1977) and the Medal "Veteran of Labour" (1988), as well as the Jubilee Medal "In Commemoration of the 100th Anniversary of the Birth of Vladimir Ilyich Lenin". She received the rank of senior lieutenant in the Military Medical Directorate.

=== Later life, personal life, and death ===
In 1986, Rahmatova stepped down as chief physician due to health issues, though she remained at the hospital as an ophthalmologist. In 1994, she retired from the hospital.

Rahmatova was married to Charogabdol Shabdolov, a librarian and trade unionist who held leadership roles in the Oblast, until his death in 2008, and they had three children. Through her marriage, her father-in-law was Soviet intelligence officer Kambar Shoabdolov.

Rahmatova died on 17 January 2019, aged 82. She was buried in Khorog.
