= Lyudmila Sorokina =

Soviet museum director

- Born: August 19, 1944; Primorsky Krai, Soviet Union
- Died: September 22, 1998 (aged 54); Moscow, Russian Federation
- Occupations: museum worker, teacher
- Political party: Communist Party of the Soviet Union (from 1976)

Lyudmila Andreevna Sorokina (Russian: Людми́ла Андре́евна Соро́кина; 19 August 1944 – 22 September 1998) was a Soviet Russian teacher, museum worker, and the first chief of the Museum of the Air Forces of the Northern Fleet.

== Biography ==
Sorokina was born on August 19, 1944, in Platonovo village in the Khankaysky District of Primorsky Krai.

In 1969 she graduated from the Historical Faculty of Vologda State Pedagogical Institute. She worked in secondary educational institutions of Chelyabinsk, Vologda and Murmansk regions and in Moscow. She advanced from a high school teacher to the deputy director of a teaching and educational complex.

In 1973–1976 she was an employee of the Naval academy in Leningrad.

In 1977 she became a guide at the Museum of the Air Forces of the Northern Fleet in Safonovo (Severomorsk). After museum reorganisation, in December 1977 Sorokina was appointed the first chief of the museum that she supervised till September 1985. Under her supervision the museum turned into a large museum complex that exhibits aircraft of the Russian Northern Fleet, Yuri Gagarin's house-museum, a hangar with a collection of aviation artifacts of the times of the Second World War and post-war time. The museum became the centre for the regional studies and military-patriotic work in Murmansk Oblast and across the Kola Peninsula. The museum is visited annually by tens of thousands of Russian and foreign visitors.

After moving to Moscow, in 1985–1987 Sorokina worked as a research worker for Mikhail Frunze Central House of Aircraft and Astronautics.

Sorokina received state awards: Medal "In Commemoration of the 850th Anniversary of Moscow" (1997) and the Medal "Veteran of Labour" (1985).

She died on September 22, 1998, and is buried in Moscow.
