= Taisiya Sergeevna Osintseva =

Russian physician

- Таисия Сергеевна Осинцева
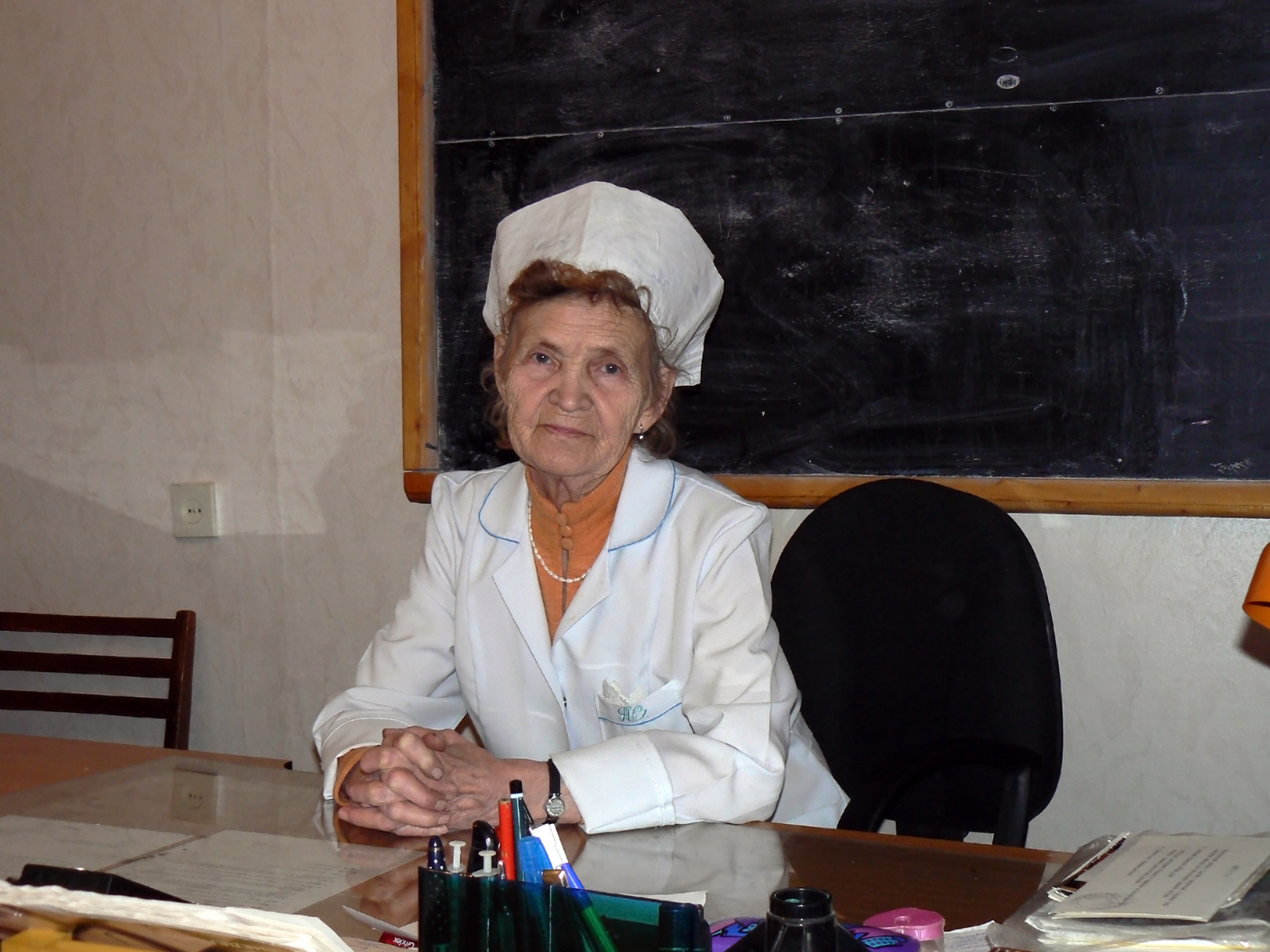
- Osintseva in 2007
- Born: October 9, 1923 (age 102); Izhevsk, Russian SFSR, Soviet Union
- Died: November 17, 2008 (aged 85); Izhevsk, Russia
- Education: Izhevsk State Medical Institute
- Known for: Chronic neuroinfections (tick-borne encephalitis, Lyme disease)
- Awards: Order of the Badge of Honor; Medal "The Veteran of Labor"; Medal "For the Valorous Labor. In commemoration of Centenary of V.I. Lenin's birth"
- Scientific career
- Fields: Neurology
- Workplaces: Izhevsk State Medical Academy (1949–2008)
- Doctoral advisor: E.M. Vizen

Signature
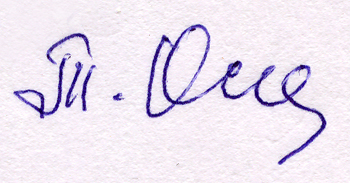

Taisiya Sergeevna (or Sergeyevna) Osintseva (Russian: Таисия Сергеевна Осинцева; October 9, 1923 – November 17, 2008) was a Soviet and Russian Professor of Neurology, The Honored Scientist of Russia, and The Honorary Professor of the Izhevsk State Medical Academy.

== Biography ==
=== Birth ===
She was born in the city of Izhevsk and was brought up in a large family. Her father, Sergey Ivanovich, was an industrial worker, and her mother, Olga Vasilyevna, was a housewife.

=== Education ===
Dr. Osintseva graduated from the Izhevsk State Medical Institute in 1946 and then continued her medical education in the neurological residency at the Department of Neurology over the next 3 years. Afterwards, she defended her Candidate of Medical Science dissertation on military neurological expertise in 1958 (the doctoral advisor was prof. E.M. Vizen), and later, in 1969, her Doctor of Medical Science thesis on chronic meningoencephalitides with epileptic syndrome.

=== Labor activity ===
After graduation from the neurological residency, she was the head of medical wards of the Neurology Department and worked simultaneously as an instructor of neurology. In 1960–1990, she led the Neurology Department of the Izhevsk State Medical Institute. In 1969, a medical genetic clinic was opened - it was the first in Udmurtia - on her own initiative. Since that time, the course of medical genetics has been taught at the Department. In 1976, she supported the course of neurosurgery to be started. 3 Doctors of Medical Science and 7 Candidates of Medical Science were trained at the Department under her supervision during her leading period. From 1990 until her last day Dr. Osintseva worked as a professor at the Neurology Department: she gave practical classes and lectures for medical students, neurological interns and residents, and practicing physicians.

=== Scientific activity ===
Her scientific interests were chronic feral nidal infections of the nervous system (tick-borne (Russian spring-summer) encephalitis, Lyme disease). She wrote nearly 160 articles, and "Tick-Borne Encephalitis: A Clinical Guide for Practicing Physicians and Medical Students" (in collaboration with Academician K.V. Bunin and Professor A.I. Chukavina, 1976).

=== Public activity ===
She was the head of the Udmurt Branch of the Russian Scientific Society of Neurologists and Psychiatrists, and the Neurologist General of the Udmurt Ministry of Health (1960–1990).

=== Awards and honorary titles ===
- Order of the Badge of Honor,
- Medal "Veteran of Labour",
- Jubilee Medal "In Commemoration of the 100th Anniversary since the Birth of Vladimir Il'ich Lenin",
- Honoured Scientist of the USSR (1986),
- Honorary Professor of the Izhevsk State Medical Academy.

=== Decease ===
Prof. Osintseva died aged 85. She was laid to rest at the Khokhryaki Cemetery (Izhevsk, Russia).

== Scientific articles ==
Here is only a list of her papers populated in PubMed:

- Shinkareva L.F., Osintseva T.S., Chernenkova M.L. [Management of pregnancy and labor in women with syringomyelia]. Akush Ginekol (Mosk). 1988 Oct;(10):65-8. [Article in Russian].
- Leksin E.N., Osintseva T.S. [Late results of treating the sequelae of brain injuries]. Zdravookhr Ross Fed. 1976 Dec;(12):31-3. [Article in Russian].
- Leksin E.N., Osintseva T.S. [The value of cerebrospinal fluid tests in the differential diagnosis of epilepsy of traumatic and infectious origin]. Zh Nevropatol Psikhiatr Im S S Korsakova. 1970;70(8):1155-9. [Article in Russian].
- Osintseva T.S. [Study of hemorrhagic encephalitis]. Sov Med. 1950 Dec;12:23-4. ISSN 0044-4588. [Article in Russian].
- Osintseva T.S. [Hemorrhagic encephalitis]. Nevropatol Psikhiatriia. 1950 Mar-Apr;19(2):13-5.[Article in Russian].
