= Mamed Aliyev =

Azerbaijan soviet station chief

- Məmməd Əliyev Əli Oğlu
- Born: 9 September 1934
- Died: 3 November 2004 (aged 70)
- Citizenship: Azerbaijani
- Occupation: Railway Station Chief
- Years active: 1950 – 2000
- Known for: Honorary Railwayman of the USSR
- Children: 6
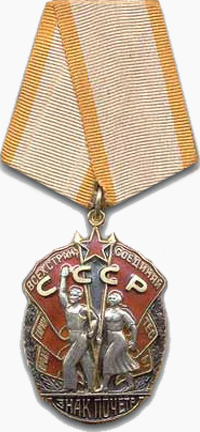
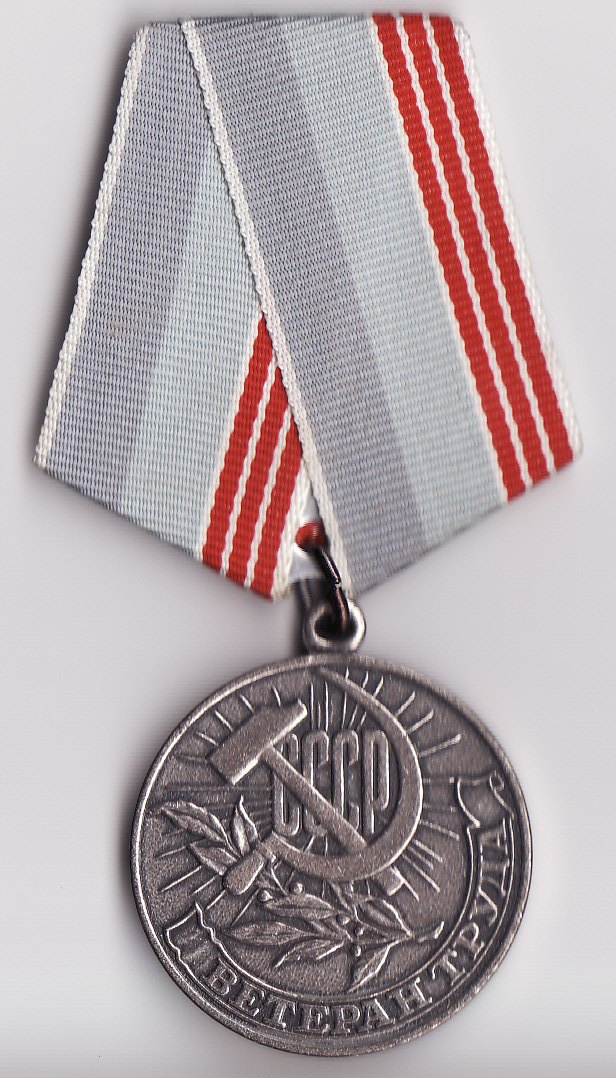
- Awards

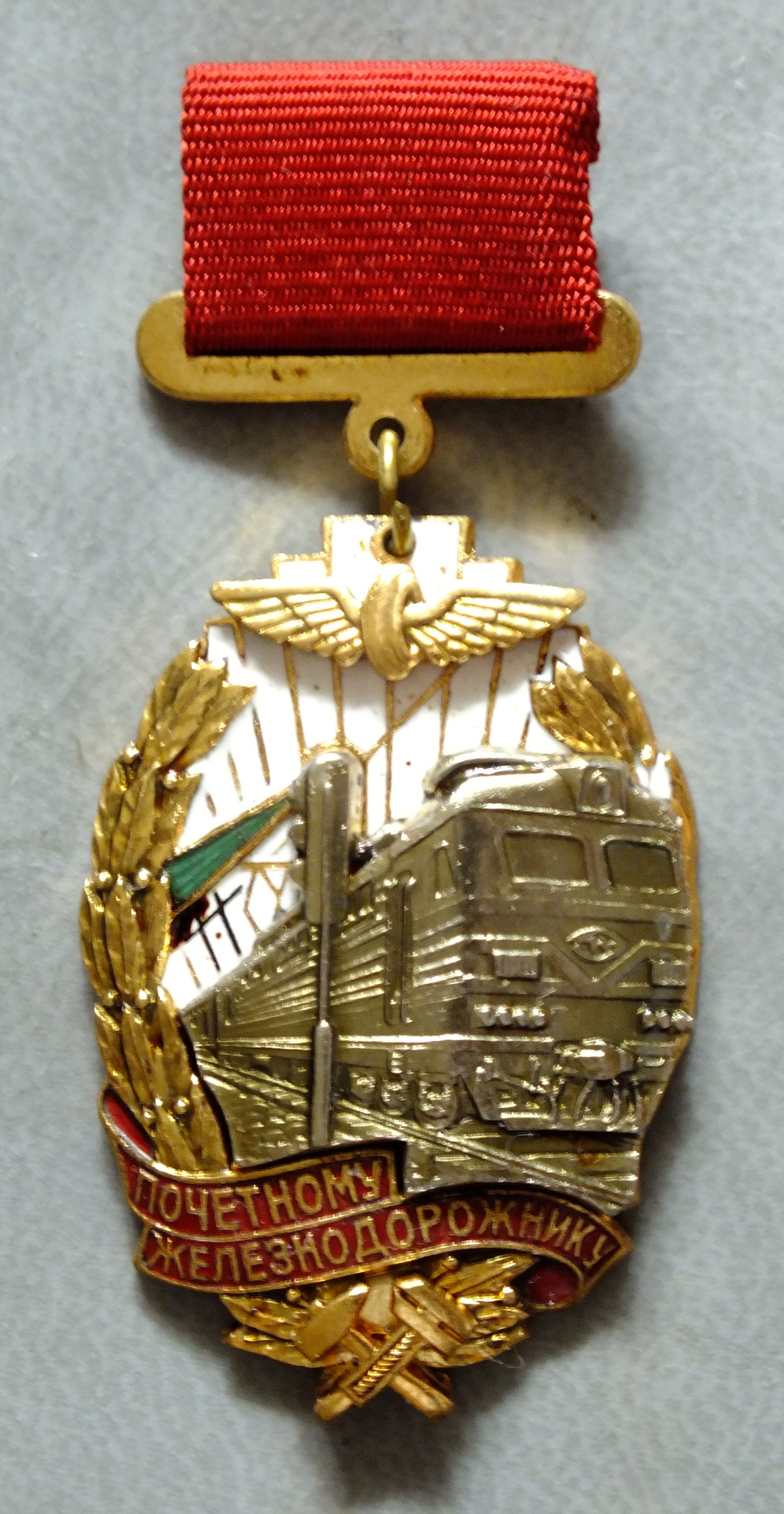
- Honours
- Website: https://mamedaliyev.com

Aliyev Mamed Ali Oglu (Azerbaijani: Əliyev Məmməd Əli oğlu, September 9, 1934 – November 3, 2004), was a recipient of the Order of the Badge of Honour, an Honorary Railwayman Badge of the USSR, and a Veteran of Labour.

== Life ==
Mamed Aliyev was born on September 9, 1934, in the Divichi, which at that time was part of the Azerbaijan SSR, and is now known as the Shabran district of Azerbaijan. He grew up in a family with deep roots and traditions in the region, and his father, Kerbalai Ustad Ali, was a respected figure, known for his work as a builder. He specialized in constructing houses and railroads, a profession that was highly regarded among the local residents, as construction at that time played an important role in developing the infrastructure and supporting the well-being of the community.

== Education ==
In 1959, Mamed Aliyev enrolled at the Baku Railway Technical School, graduating in 1963 with a qualification as a railway operations technician. In 1964, he was admitted to the Rostov Institute of Railway Engineers, where he earned a degree in railway operations engineering in 1971. In 1975, he completed advanced leadership training courses for senior railway transport officials in Moscow.

== Career ==
From 1962 to 1968, Mamed Aliyev was appointed as the head of the Nasosnu Railway Station, currently known as Zeynalabdin Taghiyev settlement.

In August 1968, he was reassigned as the head of the Davachi Railway Station, a position he held until 2000.

== Awards ==
On February 28, 1974, by decree of the Presidium of the Supreme Soviet of the USSR, Mamed Aliyev was awarded the "Order of the Badge of Honour."

On January 31, 1984, he was awarded the "Veteran of Labour" medal.

On October 31, 1984, by order of the Minister of Railways of the USSR, N.S. Konarev, he was honored with the "Honorary Railwayman" badge.

At various times, he received more than 20 Honorary Certificates from the Ministries of Railways of both the USSR and the Republic, as well as from the regional party committee.

== Publications ==
=== Books ===
- “Adın işığı” - Aydın Tağıyev, 1998
- “Eldən soruş” -2001

=== Newspapers ===
- İqtisadi ğöstəricilər - Vışka qəzeti, 20 Dekabr 1973
- Ratsionalizatorskoe predlojenie - Vışka qəzeti 25 Iyun 1976
- Ratsionalizatorskoe predlojenie - Vışka qəzeti 20 Sentyabr 1976
- Ratsionalizatorskoe predlojenie - Vışka qəzeti 12 Oktyabr 1978
- Vaqonlardan səmərəli istifadə - Bakı qəzeti 27 Noyabr 1978
- Ali sovet sədrinin fərmanı - Kommunnist qəzeti 18 Fevral 1984
- Dəmiryolçu ənənəsi - Trud qəzeti 16 Noyabr 1985
- “Bu dünyadan qatarlar gedər...” - Xalq qəzeti 4 Iyun 1999
- “ВАГОНАМ-ПОЛНУЮ НАГРУЗКУ” - Vışka qəzeti 1 Fevral 1977

Every year, valuable articles about Mamed Aliyev were published in local regional newspapers and the Azerbaijan Railway Worker newspaper.

== Family and Passing ==
Mamed Aliyev had 6 children and 16 grandchildren. His wife, Selminaz Aliyeva Shamseddin Qizi (born October 16, 1940, died on February 5, 2000 )

Children:

- Nazira Aliyeva – born in 1958, holds a higher education degree in engineering.
- Tahira Aliyeva – born in 1959, holds a higher education degree in engineering.
- Kamala Aliyeva – born in 1962, has secondary education.
- Suheyl Aliyev – born in 1964, holds a higher education degree in economics and engineering.
- Ali Aliyev – born in 1966, holds a higher education degree in engineering and law.
- Farid Aliyev – born in 1970, holds higher education degrees in economics and law.
