= Vladimir Polukhin =

Russian chemist (1932–2009)

Vladimir Polukhin Владимир Полухин
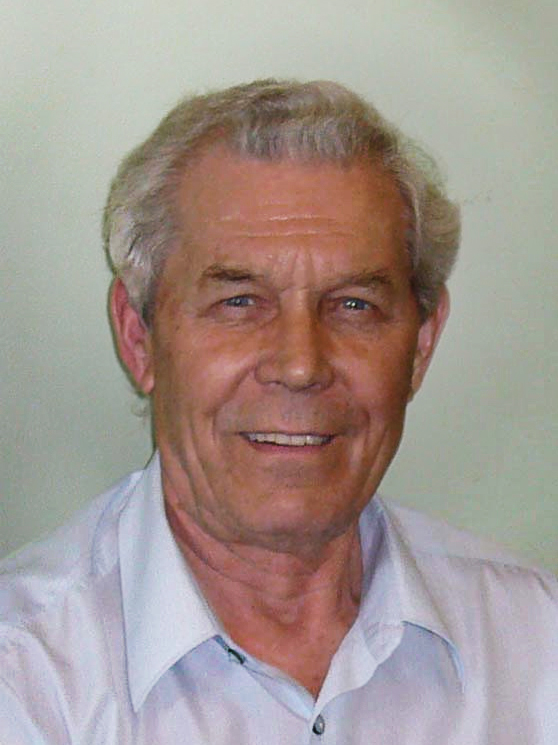
- Born: May 28, 1932; Kolishley, Penza, Soviet Union
- Died: September 3, 2009 (aged 77); St. Petersburg, Russia
- Education: State D.I.Mendeleyev University of Chemical Technology of Russia (MUCTR), Moscow, Russia
- Awards: State Prize of the USSR; "Honoured Inventor of USSR"; Grebenschikov Medal; Medal "Veteran of Labour"; Medal "In Commemoration of the 300th Anniversary of Saint Petersburg"
- Scientific career
- Fields: Optics, chemistry, physics and adjacent fields, inventor
- Workplaces: All-Russian Research Center; Vavilov State Optical Institute, St. Petersburg, Russia

Vladimir Polukhin (Russian: Владимир Николаевич Полухин) was a Russian scientist (doctor of science, Russian: 'doctor nauk') and an engineer in the field of optics.

== Career ==
Vladimir Polukhin is known for his contribution to physical chemistry and technology of optical and special types of glass, fiber-optic elements, and micro-channel structures. The research carried out under his leadership in the Vavilov State Optical Institute has found practical applications in a variety of industries including optics and electronics. Vladimir Polukhin has received multiple awards and medals including the USSR State Prize and Honoured Inventor of the USSR.

== Biography ==
Vladimir Polukhin was born on May 28, 1932, in Kolyshley (Penzenskaya Area, Russia) and spent his school years in Serdobsk (near Penza). Moscow become the city of his student years. However, his career he built up in Saint-Petersburg, Russia, where he fruitfully worked all his adult life and died in 2009).

Mendeleev Russian University of Chemistry and Technology Polukhin's alma mater, after his graduation in 1955 he received the qualification of an engineer with specialisation in training in the technology of silicates and commenced working at an Optical Glass factory in Nikolsk, Russia.

In 1957, he started his post-graduate study at the Research and Technological Institute of Optical Materials All-Russian Scientific center within Vavilov State Optical Institute which in brought him Doctoral degree in Technical Sciences. Dr.Polukhin career: having joined Vavilov State Optical Institute as a junior researcher he has become one of the leading specialists and the head of the department. Starting in the position of junior, senior, leading and chief researcher, Than has become the Head of the Laboratory of Optical Glass (1966—1982), and the Head of The Department and The Laboratory of Fiber Optics (1982—1989). He was also the founder and the leading research and development expert in "VOSTEK: fiber optics, glass, capillaries" company (Russian: ВОСтеК). The company collaborated with Russian and European institutions (Germany, Italy, Switzerland).

=== Optics ===
Until his last days, he was in charge of The Laboratory of Special Optical Glass, the Technology of Hard Fiber-Optics Elements, and Micro-channel Plates at Vavilov State Optical Institute. A notable innovator and researcher, his contribution includes the following aspects:

- Optical glass with special dispersion for large space lenses;
- Optical glass with extreme optical constants;
- Special glass combinations for optical-electronic elements fabrication – flexible medical tourniquet and superior aperture fiber-optics plates;
- Glass combinations for micro channel elements and bifocal glasses with an invisible boundary line;
- Glass for diodes fabrication and varistors covering;
- Development of fibre–optic and micro channel technology for optoelectronic converters and radiography micro channel structures and lenses.

Vladimir Polukhin published more than a hundred of scientific articles and received over hundred of certificates of recognition and patents; was awarded the title of Honoured Inventor of the USSR and many others.

== Awards ==
- State Prize of the USSR
- Honoured Inventor of the USSR
- Grebenschikov Medal
- Medal "Veteran of Labour"
- Medal "In Commemoration of the 300th Anniversary of Saint Petersburg"
- Repeat Winner of the Exhibition of Achievements of the National Economy (VDNKh, Moscow)

== Bibliography ==
Vladimir Polukhin published more than hundred of scientific works and articles (personally and in co-authorship).

- Work on fiber optics at the Vavilov State Optical Institute
- Lasing characteristics of a fiber laser based on neodymium-silicate and neodymium-phosphate glasses
- Lasing characteristics of a fiber laser based on neodymium-silicate and neodymium-phosphate glasses
- Apparatus for measuring content of moving dielectric materials moisture, Patent: US 4041375 A
- One possibility of increasing the brightness of neodymiumglass laser radiation at Soviet Journal of Quantum Electronics
- References in Glasses and the Glass Transition (2011)
