= Boris Votchal =

Soviet medical scientist (1895-1971)

Boris Evgenyevich Votchal (Russian: Борис Евгеньевич Вотчал; June 9, 1895, in Kiev - September 19, 1971, in Moscow) was a Soviet scientist, academician of the USSR Academy of Medical Sciences (since 1969), Honored Scientist of the Russian Federation (1966), and one of the founders of the clinical pharmacology in Russia.

He was a son of academician Eugene Votchal.

He graduated from the Faculty of Medicine of the Taras Shevchenko National University of Kyiv in 1918. He was a student of Feofil Yanovsky.

He worked at the Russian Medical Academy of Postgraduate Education. He was elected a Corresponding Member of the USSR Academy of Medical Sciences in 1963.

Votchal is the author of about 250 scientific papers.

== Sources ==
- Big Medical Encyclopedia (in Russian)
