= Alexander Polukhin =

Russian ice hockey forward

- Born: December 19, 1988 (age 37) Moscow, Russian SFSR, Soviet Union
- Height: 6 ft 1 in (185 cm)
- Weight: 181 lb (82 kg; 12 st 13 lb)
- Position: Forward
- Shot: Left
- Played for: HC Dynamo Moscow
- Playing career: 2007–2014

Alexander Polukhin (born December 19, 1988) is a Russian former professional ice hockey forward.

Polukhin began his career with HC Dynamo Moscow where he played 46 games in the 2007–08 Russian Superleague season and 14 games in the 2008–09 KHL season. He also played in the second-tier Vysshaya Liga and Supreme Hockey League for Gazprom-OGU Orenburg, HC Ryazan, Dynamo Tver and Buran Voronezh.
