= Alexander Dynin =

Russian mathematician

Alexander S. Dynin (Александр С. Дынин, born 1936) is a Russian mathematician at Ohio State University who introduced the Agranovich–Dynin formula. Since 2009, Dynin claims to have proved the Yang-Mills Millennium Problem.
