= Mediterranean Institute of Fundamental Physics =

Institution created to unite scientists

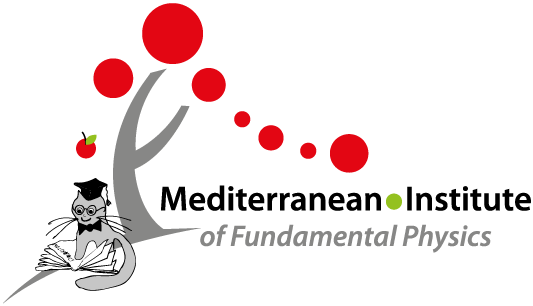
- Mediterranean Institute of Fundamental Physics
- Motto: Dubium sapientiae initium. Memento audere semper
- Motto in English: From doubt comes wisdom. Mind daring always.
- Type: Private
- Established: 2010
- Affiliations: MIFP, Mediterranean Institute of Fundamental Physics
- President: Dr. Giuseppe Eramo
- Director: Prof. Alexey Kavokin
- Administrative staff: Anna Miroshnichenko
- Location: Marino (Rome), Italy; 41.7670243°N 12.6163607°E
- Colours: Red and Black
- Website: www.mifp.eu

The Mediterranean Institute of Fundamental Physics, commonly known as MIFP, is a private independent non-governmental institution created in order to unite scientists in different countries around the world working in all fields of physics. MIFP is a non-profit organization whose main goal is to provide efficient and flexible management of international collaboration projects and teaching programmes, to ease and increase the communication between leading researchers in different areas of fundamental and applied physics, and to organize international scientific meetings, workshops, schools and conferences. It is located in Marino, Rome, Italy.

Founded in July 2010 by a small group of researchers, by the year of 2012 MIFP numbers over one hundred members. During 2010, 2011 and 2012 MIFP has held, took part in, or partly sponsored more than ten international events in Armenia, Italy, Greece, France, Ukraine, Brazil, Thailand and Russia. The mean h-index within the MIFP members is 27. About 50% of the members represent Russian scientific diaspora.

MIFP is financed from the research grants and by private donations.

== History ==
In the year of 2001, the 1st French-Russian Meeting on New trends in Solid State Physics in Clermont-Ferrand, France which was sponsored by Valéry Giscard d'Estaing started a series of annual meetings of world leading experts in solid state physics. Further meetings have been held in Clermont-Ferrand on a yearly basis from 2002 to 2006 to be followed by Meetings in Rome in 2007, 2008, 2009 and 2010 with constantly increasing number of participating scientists. Shortly after the 2010 annual meeting, a group of researchers working in different countries decided to create a private organization which main goal would be bringing together a strong international team providing a stimulating research environment and working atmosphere. Another mission of MIFP was reunification of the Russian scientists who spread all over the world after the fall of the Soviet Union in 1991. With a support from Dr. Giuseppe Eramo, University of Rome II Tor Vergata, MIFP was founded on 1 July 2010, and Prof. Alexey Kavokin, University of Southampton, was appointed its Scientific director. The institute started function within the campus of the University of Rome II Tor Vergata, and moved to Marino, Rome later that year. Starting from the year 2011, the yearly scientific meetings became Annual MIFP March Meetings gathering scientists working not only in Solid state physics but in a great variety of fields.

=== Events ===
- September 2010 MIFP becomes a sponsor of the International School of Nanophotonics and Photovoltaics (ISNP) in Tsaghkadzor, Armenia.
- December 2010 A group of PhD students from Saint-Petersburg with the help of MIFP visited the leading Italian laboratories in Rome, Pisa, Pavia and Trento.
- March 2011 1 March Meeting of MIFP in Rome.
- May 2011 NanoEuroMed Meeting gathers the leading scientists of the European Community in Multifunctional Nanomaterials. The Meeting is held under the auspice of MIFP.
- May 2011 MIFP takes part in the ESF conference in Crete.
- September 2011 IMMEA conference in Adagir.
- September 2011 MIFP organizes the International School of Nanophotonics and Photovoltaics (ISNP-2011) in Maratea, Italy.
- October 2011 The scientific director of MIFP Alexey Kavokin wins the Russian governmental megagrant, which opens the funding for a new laboratory in Saint-Petersburg State University.
- November 2011 With the partnership of MIFP, the Spin Optics Laboratory (SOLAB) in Saint-Petersburg, Russia is founded. Budget of 150 million roubles from the megagrant for 2 years provides 6 Master's degree and 10 Doctor of Philosophy (PhD) programs, 4 PostDoctoral and 4 staff positions, and contribute to CLERMONT 4 and SpinOptronics European programs.
- January 2012 The meeting between MIFP members and leading researchers from Brazil and Latin America in Campinas, São Paulo, Brazil.
- March 2012 MIFP convenes the ESF Workshop on "Polaritonics: Form Basic Research to Device Applications".
- March 2012 2 March Meeting of MIFP in Rome, combined with the Project Meeting of the European Network SIMTECH: "New century of superconductivity: Materials, Ideas, Thechnologies".
- April 2012 MIFP organizes the Vth International School of Nanophotonics and Photovoltaics (ISNP-2012) on Phuket, Thailand.
- 2020 By the year of 2020, MIFP unites 230 members.

=== List of Doctors Honoris Causa of the MIFP ===
- 2014 Andrey Varlamov,
- 2015 Zhanghai Chen and Mikhail Portnoi,
- 2016 Sven Hoefling,
- 2017 Galia Pozina,
- 2018 Olivia Pulci,
- 2019 Aldo Di Carlo and Alexander Buzdin.

== Goals ==
The major goal of MIFP is the creation of an environment for fruitful research activities, decreasing the amount of administrative and logistics problems for the members of the Institute, providing flexible management, promotion of fundamental physics in the Mediterranean region, sponsoring the collaboration projects in physics across Europe, although it stays open for any offers from all continents. MIFP promotes the high-school teaching programs in physics. The Institute organizes the International Conferences on Physics of Light-Matter Coupling in Nanostructures and International Schools on Nanophotonics and Photovoltaics. Members can request management assistance from MIFP for grant applications/organization of events or any other collaboration.

MIFP strategic goal is to evolve from an essentially virtual private institution with the administrative base of several persons to the full-scale international research centre with developed infrastructure, laboratories, the core of permanent researchers (20-30 positions), PostDocs, PhD students and visiting professors (50-60 positions), and relevant administration and technical team (20-25 persons). MIFP intends attracting the highest international level scientists for permanent or fixed-term research positions with competitive salaries.

== Scientific Council of MIFP ==
The Institute is governed by Scientific Council currently consisting of 6 members which are elected by the Members of MIFP at the March Meetings of the Institute. Each member is elected for a five-year period. At quarterly meetings the members of Scientific Council decide on the general scientific strategy of MIFP and approve the addition of the new members of the Institute according to the requests submitted from the candidates.

President: Prof. Boris Altshuler, Columbia University, United States

Members:

Prof. Alexey Kavokin, Physics and Astronomy School, University of Southampton, UK - Scientific Director of MIFP

Prof. Rinaldo Santonico, Physics Department, University of Rome II, Italy

Prof. Andrey Varlamov, Consiglio Nazionale delle Ricerche, Italy

Prof. Aldo Di Carlo, Engineering Department, University of Rome II, Italy

Prof. Igor Lukyanchuk, Université d'Amiens, France

== MIFP Cocktail ==
Specially for Annual meetings of the Institute as well as other MIFP events, a special cocktail was invented by Massimiliano Romano. The ingredients are: Martini Rosso, Ice, Fresh Oranges, and Pepper from Sichuan, making the acronym of the MIFP. The cocktail was named "Make It For Pleasure".

Massimiliano Romano also invented the Balsamic Gin & Tonic at Lainston House Hotel in 1999.
