= Alexey Kavokin =

Russian-French physics professor

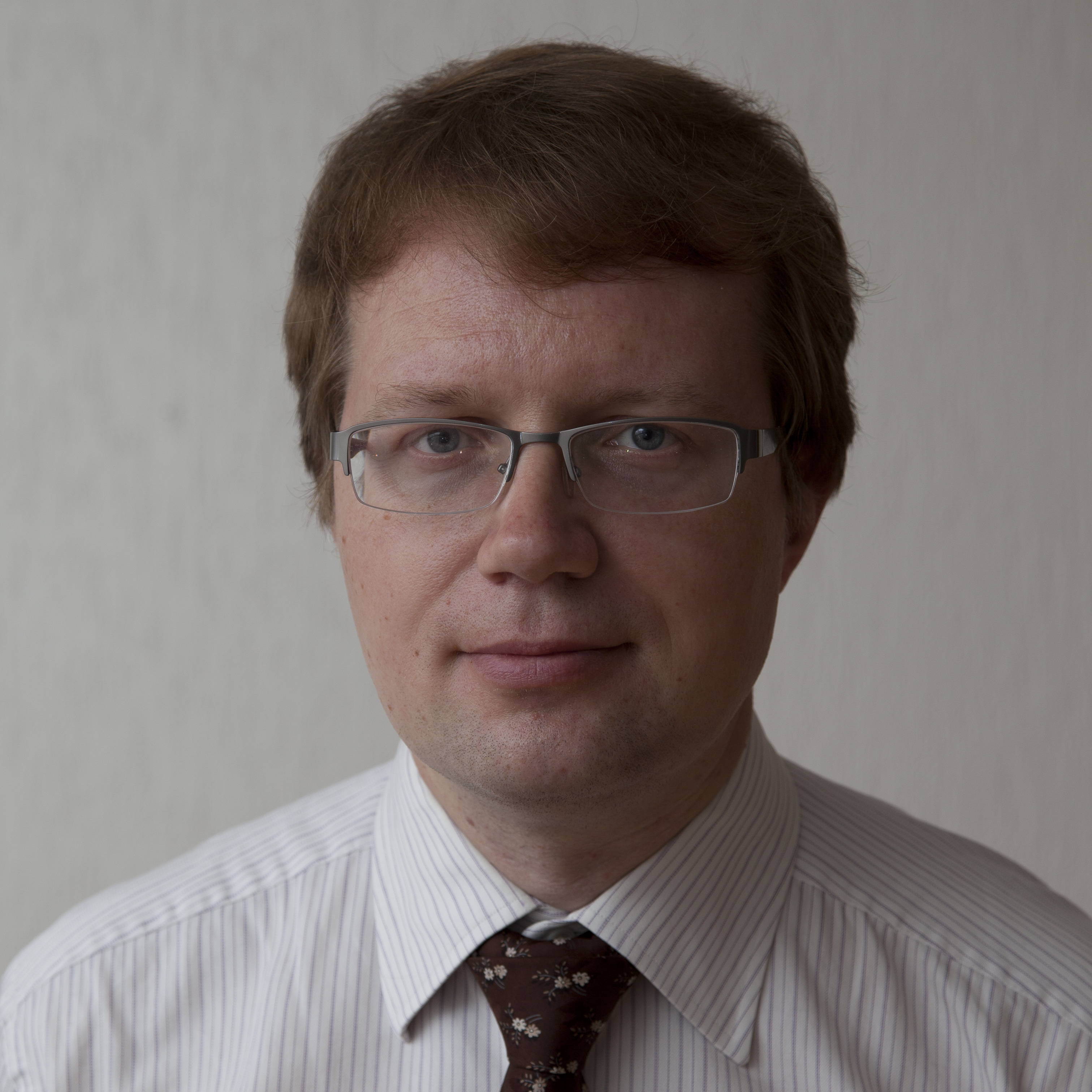
- Born: 7 March 1970 (age 56); Leningrad
- Spouse: Grudskaya
- Scientific career
- Fields: Solid State Physics
- Institutions: University of Southampton, Mediterranean Institute of Fundamental Physics, Westlake University

Alexey V. Kavokin (born 7 March 1970 in Leningrad) is a Russian and French theoretical physicist and writer.

He is an expert in solid state optics and semiconductor physics.

== Life ==
He graduated from the Saint Petersburg Polytechnical University in 1991. He was a member of staff of the Ioffe Physico-Technical institute (1992–2000). He graduated from the Ioffe Physico-Technical institute in 1993, with a PhD in physics and mathematics, supervisor Prof. E.L. Ivchenko. He was a professor at the Blaise Pascal University (Clermont-Ferrand, France, 1998 – 2005). He is a professor at the University of Southampton (United Kingdom, 2005 – 2018). In July 2010, he co-founded the Mediterranean Institute of Fundamental Physics with the support of Dr. Giuseppe Eramo and was appointed scientific director. In 2018, he joined the Westlake University (Hangzhou, China) as a Chair Professor and Director of the International Center for Polaritonics.

He is the brother of physicist Kirill Kavokin. He is married, with 4 children.

== Prizes and awards ==
- Headliner Award 2020, for the research on quantum computers based on liquid light.
- E.F. Gross Medal for defining contribution into development of modern Polaritonics: physics of light-matter coupling in semiconductor nano- and microstructures, 2020.
- ISCS 2020 Quantum Devices Award.
- Honorary professor of the Vladimir State university, 2017
- Doctor Honoris Causa of the Russian-Armenian University, Erevan, Armenia, 2017
- Established Career Fellowship by EPSRC, UK 2012.
- Winner of the "Megagrant" of the Russian Ministry of Science and Education, 2011.
- Chairholder of the Marie Curie Chair of Excellence in Polaritonics, Rome, Tor Vergata, 2006.
- Prize of the Scientific Council of A.F. Ioffe Institute for the Best Scientific Work of the year 1998 for "Observation of above-barrier exciton states" (with M.E. Sasin and R.P. Seisyan).
- Prize of the Scientific Council of A.F. Ioffe Institute for the Best Scientific Work of the year 1996 for "Theory of exciton magnetic polarons" (with K.V. Kavokin and I.A. Merkulov).

== Other responsibilities ==
Program chairman: Forum "Science of the Future", Sevastopol, 2015, Kazan 2016, Nizhniy Novgorod 2017

Member of Evaluation panel: Institut Universitaire de France, 2010, 2011

Expert of the French ANR program: 2009–2017, Horizon 2020: 2015–2017

Member of Material Science Panel for evaluation of CNR Laboratories (Italy), Since 2009

Editor of the “Superlattices and Microstructures”, Elsevier since 2016

Referee for the journals: Nature, Science, Physical Review Letters and others

== Publications ==
=== Scientific output ===
> 450 publications in peer reviewed international scientific journals: 1 in Science, 2 in Nature, 3 in Nature Physics, 4 in Nature Photonics, 1 in Nature Materials, 4 in Nature Communications, 2 in PNAS, 2 in Light: Science and Applications, 1 in Nano Letters, 2 in Physical Review X, 46 in Physical Review Letters, 98 in Physical Review B, 10 in Applied Physics Letters, 4 Topical Reviews, 19787 citations (Dec. 2020). h = 55 (Web of Science), h = 70 (Google scholar).

=== The most important publications ===
- S. Hoefling and A.V. Kavokin, A historic experiment redesigned, Nature, 514, 313–314 (2014).
- A. A. High, J. R. Leonard, A. T. Hammack, M. M. Fogler, L. V. Butov, A. V. Kavokin, K. L. Campman & A. C. Gossard, Spontaneous coherence in a cold exciton gas, Nature, 483, 584 (2012).
- E.Wertz, L. Ferrier, D. D. Solnyshkov, R. Johne, D. Sanvitto, A. Lemaître I. Sagnes, R. Grousson, A. V. Kavokin, P. Senellart, G. Malpuech and J. Bloch, Spontaneous formation and optical manipulation of extended polariton condensates, Nature Physics, 6, 860 (2010).
- K. Lagoudakis, T. Ostatnicky, A.V. Kavokin, Y.G. Rubo, R. Andre, and B. Deveaud-Pledran, Observation of Half-Quantum Vortices in an Exciton-Polariton Condensate, Science, 326, 974 (2009).
- S. Christopoulos, G. Baldassarri von Högersthal, A. J. Grundy, P. G. Lagoudakis, A. V. Kavokin, J. J. Baumberg, G. Christmann, R. Butté, E. Feltin, J.-F. Carlin, and N. Grandjean, Room-Temperature Polariton Lasing in Semiconductor Microcavities, Phys. Rev. Lett. 98, 126405 (2007).
- C. Leyder, M. Romanelli, J.Ph. Karr, E. Giacobino, T.C.H. Liew, M.M. Glazov, A.V. Kavokin, G. Malpuech, A. Bramati, A., Observation of the optical spin Hall effect, Nature Physics 3, 628 (2007).
- I.A. Shelykh, Yuri G. Rubo, G. Malpuech, D. D. Solnyshkov, and A. Kavokin, Polarization and Propagation of Polariton Condensates, Phys. Rev. Lett. 97, 066402 (2006).
- M. Richard, J. Kasprzak, R. Andre, R. Romestein, Le Si Dang, G. Malpuech, and A.V. Kavokin, Experimental evidence for non-equilibrium Bose condensation of exciton-polaritons, Phys. Rev. B, 72, 201301 (2005).
- A. Kavokin, G. Malpuech, and M. Glazov, Optical Spin Hall Effect, Phys. Rev. Lett. 95, 136601 (2005).
- F. P. Laussy, G. Malpuech, A. Kavokin, and P. Bigenwald, Spontaneous Coherence Buildup in a Polariton Laser, Phys. Rev. Lett. 93, 016402 (2004).
- T.V. Shubina, S.V. Ivanov, V. N. Jmerik, D. D. Solnyshkov, V. A. Vekshin, P. S. Kop’ev, A. Vasson, J. Leymarie, A. Kavokin, H. Amano, K. Shimono, A. Kasic and B. Monemar, Mie Resonances, Infrared Emission, and the Band Gap of InN, Phys. Rev. Lett. 92, 117407 (2004).
- G. Malpuech, A. Kavokin, A. Di Carlo and J.J. Baumberg, Polariton lasing by exciton-electron scattering in semiconductor microcavities, Phys. Rev. B 65, 153310 (2002).

=== Research monographs ===
- A. V. Kavokin; G. Malpuech (2003). Cavity polaritons. Elsevier. ISBN 978-0-12-533032-9.
- A. V. Kavokin; J.J. Baumberg; G. Malpuech & F.P. Laussy (2017). Microcavities (Second ed.). Oxford University Press. ISBN 978-0-19-922894-2.

=== Novel ===
- "Saladin the Cat" (in Russian, ERA, Moscow, 2006)
