= Agranovich–Dynin formula =

In mathematical analysis, the Agranovich–Dynin formula is a formula for the index of an elliptic system of differential operators, introduced by Agranovich and Dynin (1962).
