= Dynín =

- Municipality
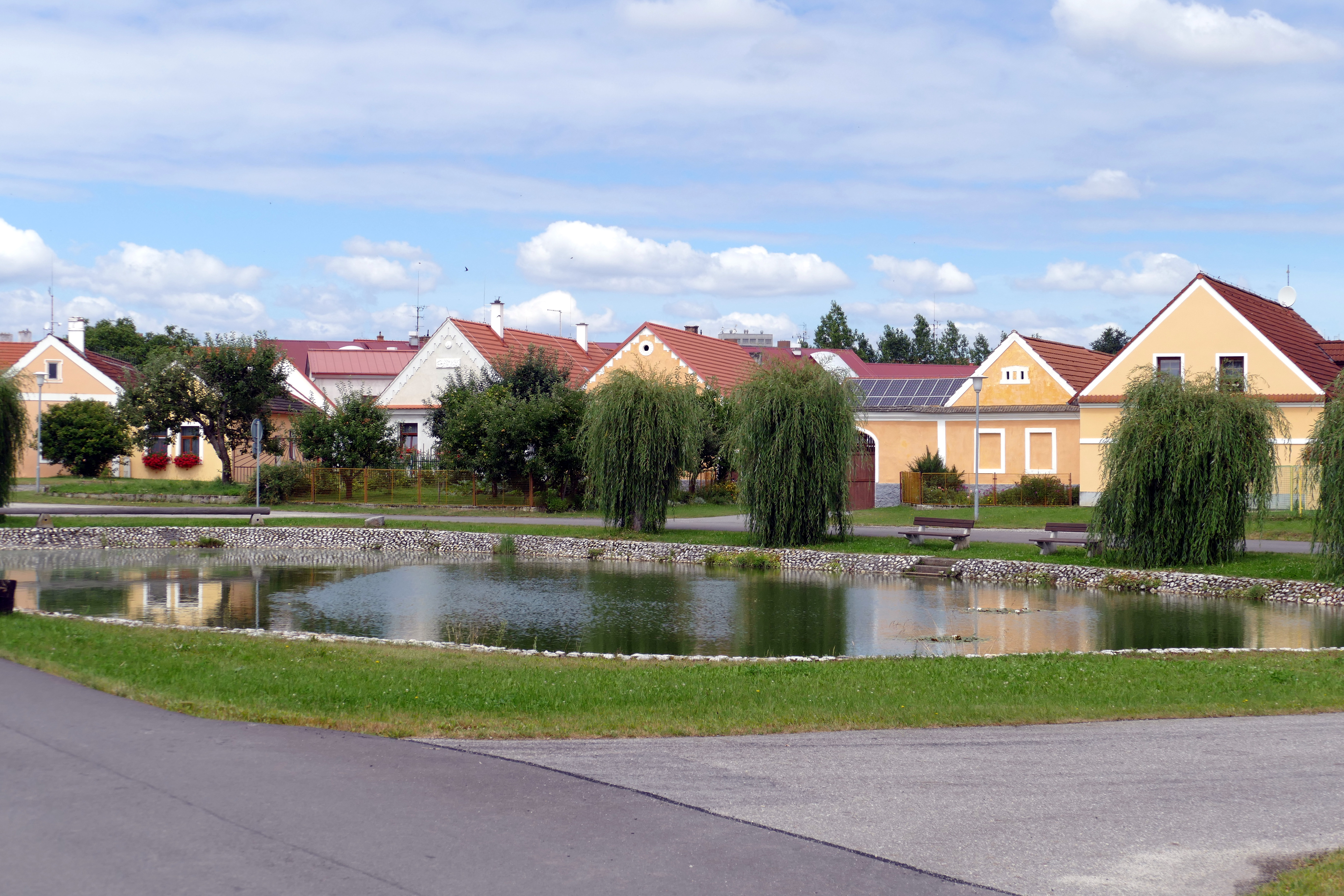
- Centre of Dynín

- Flag Coat of arms

- Location in the Czech Republic
- Coordinates: 49°8′14″N 14°37′52″E
- Country: Czech Republic
- Region: South Bohemian
- District: České Budějovice
- First mentioned: 1341

Area
  - Total: 13.13 km^{2} (5.07 sq mi)
- Elevation: 424 m (1,391 ft)

Population (2026-01-01)
  - Total: 386
  - Density: 29.4/km^{2} (76.1/sq mi)
- Time zone: UTC+1 (CET)
  - Summer (DST): UTC+2 (CEST)
- Postal code: 373 64
- Website: www.obecdynin.cz

Dynín is a municipality and village in České Budějovice District in the South Bohemian Region of the Czech Republic. It has about 400 inhabitants.

== Administrative division ==
Dynín consists of two municipal parts (in brackets population according to the 2021 census):

- Dynín (311)
- Lhota (31)

== Etymology ==
The name is derived from the personal name Dýňa, meaning "Dýňa's (court)". However, until 1923, the name was written as Dinín.

== Geography ==
Dynín is located about 20 kilometres (12 mi) northeast of České Budějovice. It lies in a flat landscape in the Třeboň Basin. The eastern part of the municipality extends into the Třeboňsko Protected Landscape Area. The area of Dynín is rich in fishponds.

== History ==
The first written mention of Dynín is from 1341, when Peter I of Rosenberg donated part of the village to the Dominican monastery in Sezimovo Ústí. During the Thirty Years' War, the village was completely destroyed, but it was restored. In 1660, Dynín was listed as part of the Třeboň estate, and the estate was bought by the Schwarzenberg family. The Schwarzenbergs owned Dynín until the establishment of an independent municipality in 1850.

== Demographics ==
Historical population

| Year | Pop. | ±% |
|---|---|---|
| 1869 | 532 | — |
| 1880 | 534 | +0.4% |
| 1890 | 526 | −1.5% |
| 1900 | 521 | −1.0% |
| 1910 | 499 | −4.2% |

| Year | Pop. | ±% |
|---|---|---|
| 1921 | 478 | −4.2% |
| 1930 | 448 | −6.3% |
| 1950 | 371 | −17.2% |
| 1961 | 399 | +7.5% |
| 1970 | 345 | −13.5% |

| Year | Pop. | ±% |
|---|---|---|
| 1980 | 390 | +13.0% |
| 1991 | 351 | −10.0% |
| 2001 | 344 | −2.0% |
| 2011 | 319 | −7.3% |
| 2021 | 342 | +7.2% |

Source: Censuses

== Transport ==
The D3 motorway (part of the European route E55) from České Budějovice to Tábor runs through the municipality.

Dynín is located on the railway line České Budějovice–Tábor.

== Sights ==
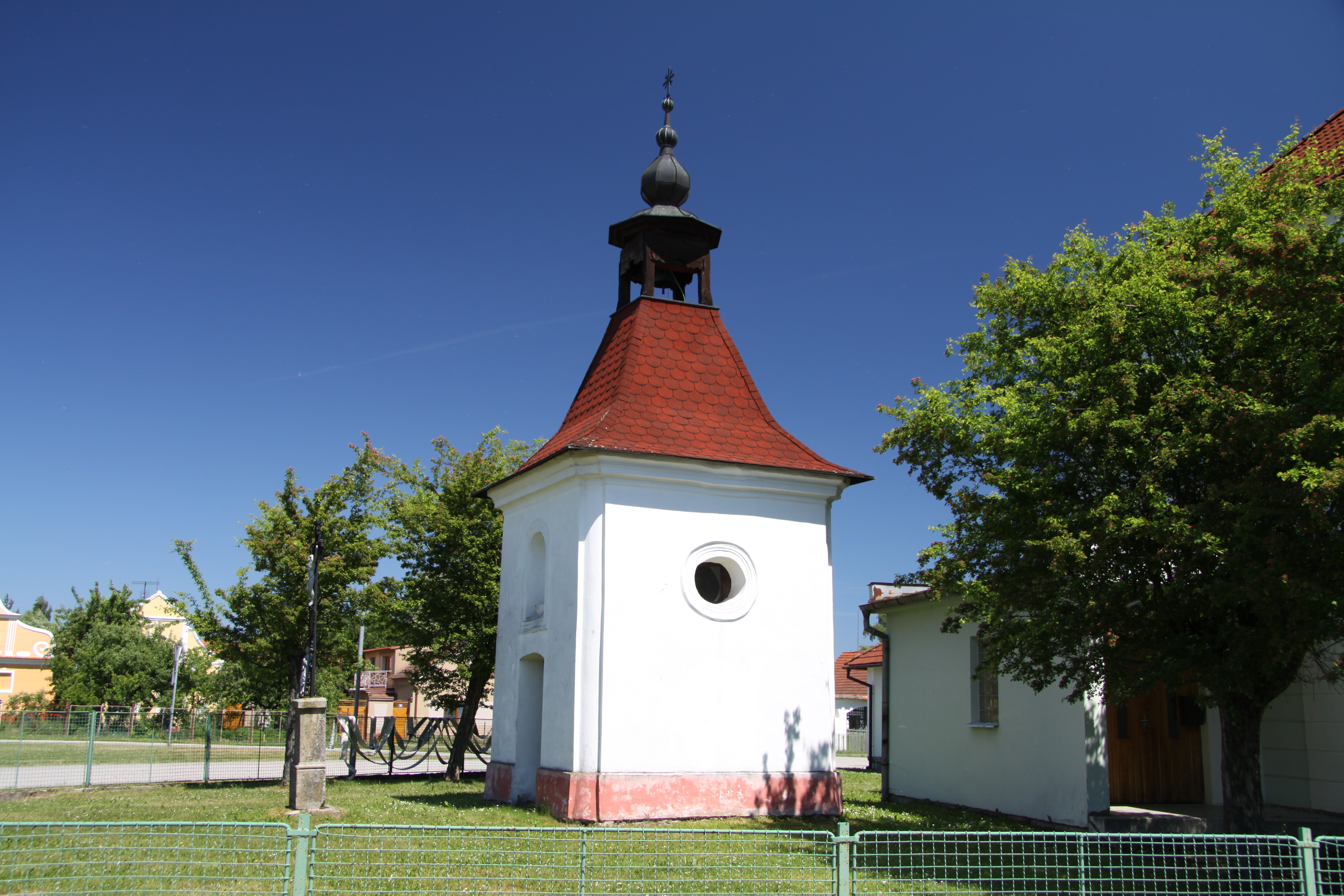
Chapel of Saint Wenceslaus

The village of Dynín is protected as a village monument zone for its preserved medieval floor plan and a set of brick folk buildings from the turn of the 19th and 20th century. Among the protected cultural monuments are three homesteads that are valuable examples of local folk architecture.

The main landmark of Dynín is the Chapel of Saint Wenceslaus.
