= Spin Optics Laboratory =

Spin Optics Laboratory (SOLAB) is named after Igor Nikolaevich Uraltsev and located at the V. A. Fock Institute of Physics of Saint Petersburg State University. It is funded by the megagrant of Russian Federation government. Prof. Alexey Kavokin is the head of the Laboratory.

SOLAB studies the spin currents induced by light in semiconductor structures. It deals with exciton polaritons: mixed light-matter quasi-particles, which obey bosonic statistics and can form condensates and coherent fluids. Polariton spin currents are expected to form a basis of a new set of logic devices, where information would be encoded by spin or polarisation. SOLAB is aiming at controlling the polariton spins on a picosecond timescale, which would allow one to encode information and transmit it on a terahertz frequency.

== The experimental facilities ==
- time- and spatially resolved Faraday and Kerr rotation spectroscopy;
- two-color pump-probe spectroscopy;
- spin noise spectroscopy;
- angular resolved photoluminescence, reflectivity and Raman spectroscopy;
- time-resolved magneto-photoluminescence.

== Collaborates ==
The Spin Optics laboratory strongly collaborates with the world-leading research centers, including:

- Cavendish Laboratory, Cambridge, (UK)
- Laboratoire de Photonique et Nanostructures, CNRS, Marcoussis, (France)
- École Polytechnique Fédérale de Lausanne (Switzerland)
- University of California, San Diego (USA)
- University of Heraklion (Greece)
- Technical University of Dortmund (Germany)
- Ioffe Institute (Russia)
