= Honoured Inventor of the USSR =

Honorary title Honoured Inventor of the USSR
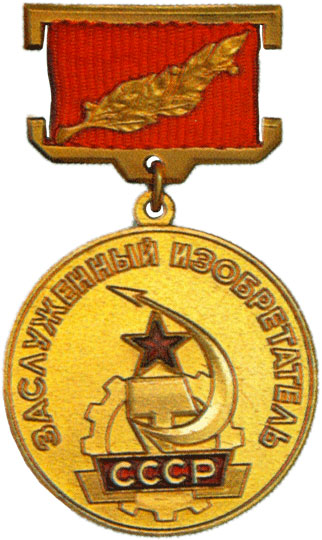
- Obverse of the chest badge "Honoured Inventor of the USSR"
- Type: Honorary title
- Awarded for: Excellent inventions
- Presented by: USSR
- Eligibility: Citizens of the Soviet Union
- Status: No longer awarded
- Established: 28 December 1981
- Final award: 1991

Highlights
- Total: 16

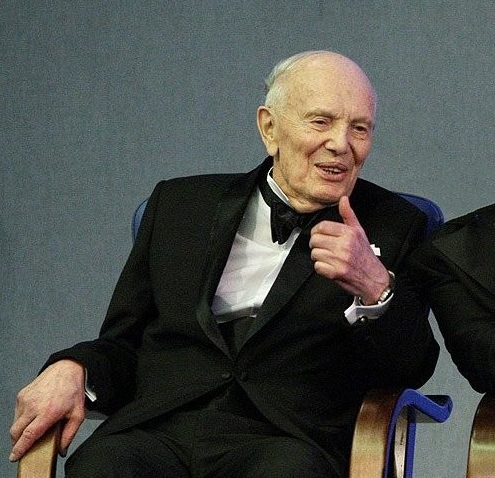
"Honoured Inventor of the USSR" #1 Borys Paton

The Honorary Title "Honoured Inventor of the USSR" (Russian: Заслуженный изобретатель СССР) was a state award of the Soviet Union established on 28 December 1981 by Decree of the Presidium of the Supreme Soviet No. 6277-X to recognise and reward innovations in technology. Its statute was later confirmed on 22 August 1988 by Decree of the Presidium of the Supreme Soviet No. 9441-XI. It ceased to be awarded following the December 1991 dissolution of the Soviet Union and was replaced in 1992 by the Honorary Title "Honoured Inventor of the Russian Federation".

== Award statute ==
The Honorary Title "Honoured Inventor of the USSR" was awarded by the Presidium of the Supreme Soviet to the authors of inventions, for opening new avenues in the development of engineering and technology, or that had a particularly important economic value.

The Presidium of the Supreme Soviet of the USSR was the main conferring authority of the award based on recommendations from the State Committee for Inventions and Discoveries of the USSR and the Central Council of the All-Union Society of Inventors and Innovators.

The chest badge (medal) "Honoured Inventor of the USSR" was worn on the right side of the chest and in the presence of other awards of the USSR, placed above them. If worn with honorary titles of the Russian Federation, the latter have precedence.

== Award description ==
The "Honoured Inventor of the USSR" chest badge was a 30mm in diameter gold-plated tombac circular medal. On its obverse, a red enamelled five pointed star over a hammer and sickle and gears, the upper tip of the sickle becoming a missile in flight arcs around the right side of the star to a point at its upper left. Following the left, top and right medal circumference, the relief inscription "Honoured Inventor" (Russian: Заслуженный изобретатель), near the bottom, a red enamelled rectangle bearing the gilt inscription "USSR" (Russian: CCCP). On the otherwise plain reverse, the relief inscription ""Honoured inventor of the USSR – creator of scientific and technological progress" (Russian: "Заслуженный изобретатель СССР – творец научно-технического прогресса").

The medal was secured to a gilt tombac 24,5mm wide x 16mm high rectangular mount by a ring through the suspension loop. The mount was covered by a scarlet silk moiré ribbon. A gilt tombac laurel branch was affixed to the ribbon.

== Recipients ==
The Honorary Title "Honoured Inventor of the USSR" was awarded a total of sixteen times, below is the complete list of recipients.

1. Borys Paton (1983)
2. Leo Nikolayevich Koshkin (1984)
3. Svyatoslav Fyodorov (1984)
4. Leonid Ivanovich Danilov (1984)
5. Gavriil Ilizarov (1985)
6. Andrew Nikiforovich Filippov (1985)
7. Alexander Dmitrievich Kostylev (1987)
8. Anatoly Pavlovich Dostanko (1987)
9. Kazimieras Ragulskis (1987)
10. Dmitri Dmitrievich Matveenko (1988)
11. Vera Aleksandrovna Portnyagina (1988)
12. Alexander Davidovich Kurdadze (1988)
13. Igor Leonardovich Pioro (1990)
14. Alexander Ivanovich Bliskunov (1990)
15. Vladimir Gevorkovich Grigoryan (1991)
16. Mir Karim-Ogly Seid-Rza (1991)
17. Leo Moiseevich Panasyuk (1991)

== See also ==
- Honoured Inventor of the RSFSR
- Orders, decorations, and medals of the Soviet Union
- Badges and Decorations of the Soviet Union
