= Evgeny Agranovich =

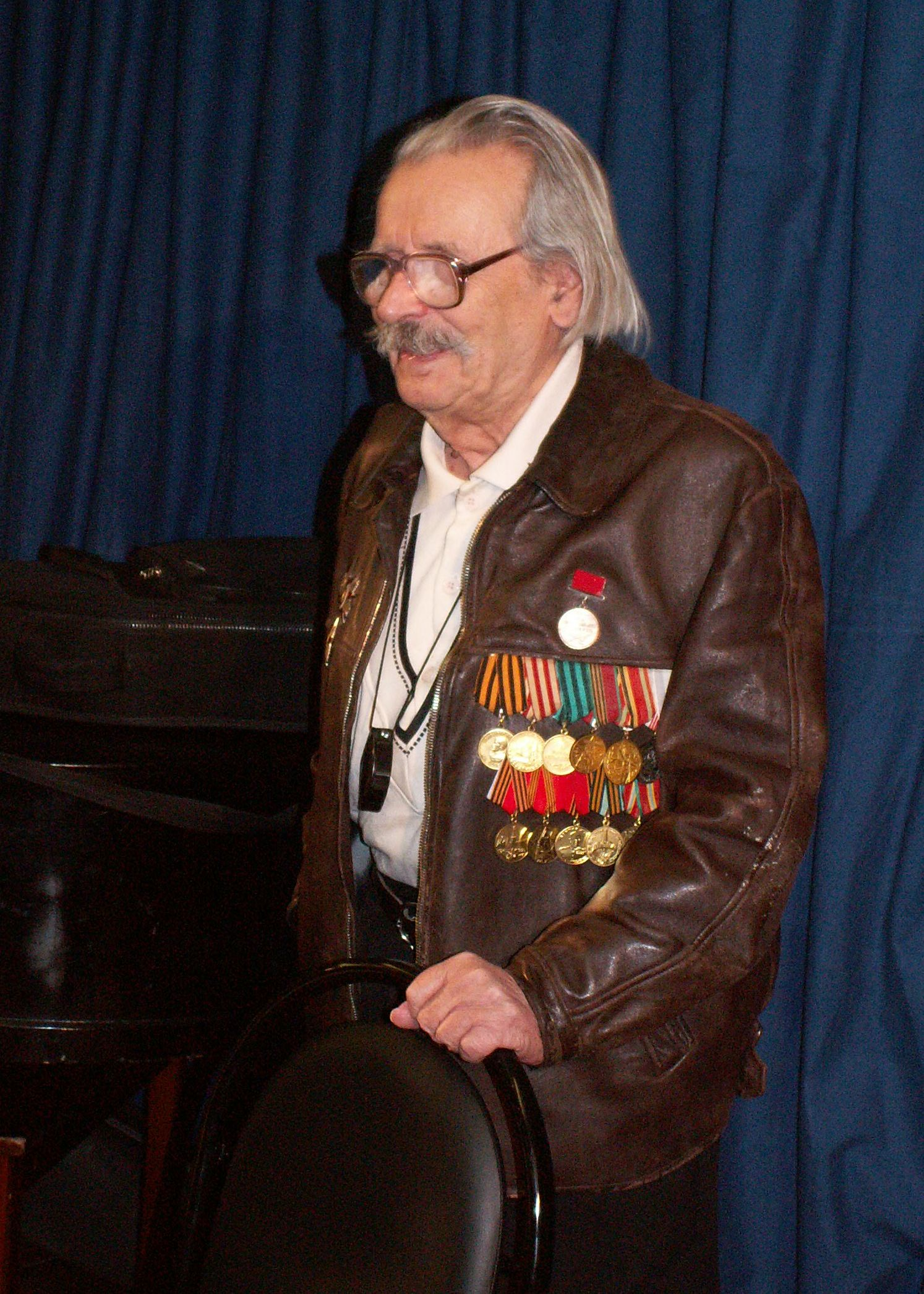
- Agranovich in 2007
- Born: October 13, 1918; Oryol, Russia
- Died: January 29, 2010 (aged 91); Moscow, Russia
- Resting place: Russia
- Citizenship: Russia
- Occupations: Poet, bard
- Writing career
- Language: Russian
- Genre: Poetry

Evgeny Danilovich Agranovich (Russian: Евге́ний Дани́лович Аграно́вич, IPA: [jɪvˈɡʲenʲɪj dɐˈnʲiləvʲɪtɕ ɐɡrɐˈnovʲɪtɕ]; 13 October 1918, Oryol, Russia – 29 January 2010, Moscow, Russia) was a Soviet poet and bard.

He was an alumnus of the Maxim Gorky Literature Institute. Eugeny Agranovich wrote many popular Russian songs including "Одесса-мама" (Odessa-mama, Odessa the Mother), "Я в весеннем лесу пил берёзовый сок" (Ya v vessennem lesu pil beryozovy sok, I Drank a Birch Sap in the Spring Forest), and "Вечный огонь" (Vechny Ogon, The Eternal Flame).
