= Mikhail Agranovich (mathematician) =

Russian mathematician (1931–2017)

Mikhail Semyonovich Agranovich (Russian: Михаил Семёнович Агранович; January 4, 1931, Moscow – February 14, 2017) was a Russian mathematician working on partial differential equations who introduced the Agranovich–Dynin formula.
