= Honoured Inventor of the RSFSR =

Honorary title Honoured Inventor of the RSFSR
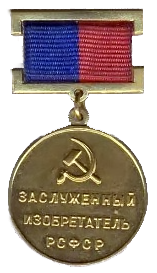
- Chest badge "Honoured Inventor of the RSFSR"
- Type: Honorary title
- Awarded for: Inventions of national importance, major and lasting contribution in technological progress
- Presented by: Russian SFSR
- Eligibility: Citizens of the Soviet Union
- Status: No longer awarded
- Established: April 20, 1961
- Related: Honoured Inventor of the USSR

The Honorary Title "Honoured Inventor of the RSFSR" (Russian: Заслуженный изобретатель РСФСР) was the highest award for inventors of the Russian Soviet Federative Socialist Republic of the USSR. It got established on April 20, 1961 and was awarded to individuals for inventions of national importance and their major contribution to technological progress and long activities in engineering or science.

== Notable Recipients (partial list) ==
- Nikolay Mikhaylovich Afanasyev (1968)
- B. G. Ignat'ev
- Gavriil Ilizarov (1965), (1975)
- E.I.Kazantsev
- Boris Laskonin (1964)
- Ivan Ivanovich Manilo
- Alexander Nadiradze (1973)
- I. I. Sobol
- L. I. Trachtenberg

== See also ==
- Honoured Inventor of the USSR
