= Gromov Flight Research Institute =

Russian aerospace research and testing centre

Coordinates: 55°33′29.54″N 38°8′47.42″E

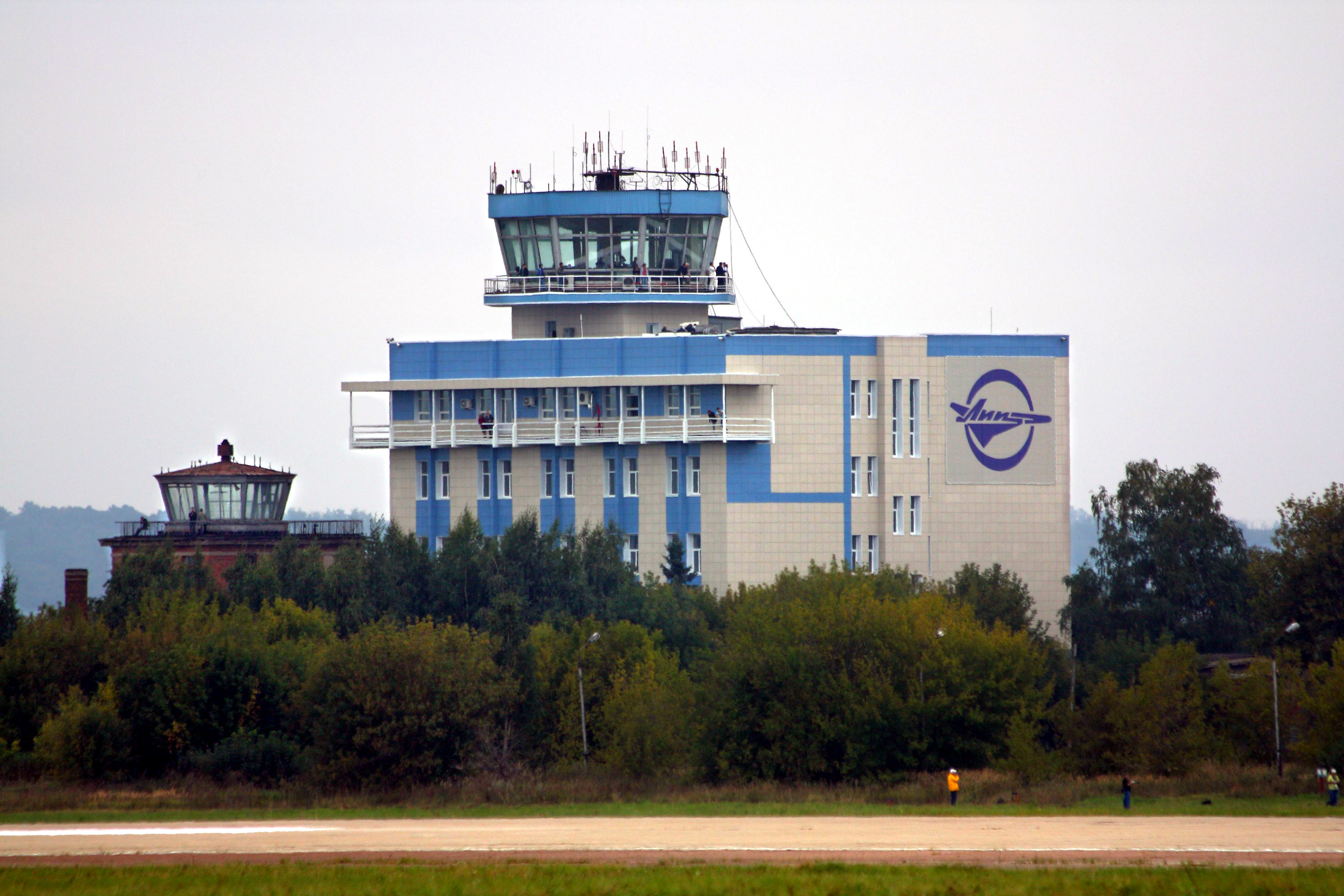
- Native name: Лётно-исследовательский институт имени М. М. Громова
- Company type: Joint-stock company
- Industry: Aerospace
- Founded: 1941; 84 years ago
- Founder: Mikhail Gromov
- Headquarters: Zhukovsky, Russia
- Area served: Europe and Asia
- Owner: Russian Federation
- Parent: United Aircraft Corporation
- Website: www.lii.ru (in Russian)

The Gromov Flight Research Institute or GFRI for short (Russian: Лётно-исследовательский институт имени М. М. Громова, Russian: ЛИИ) is an important Russian State Research Centre which operates an aircraft test base located in Zhukovsky, 40 km south-east of Moscow. The airfield is also known as Ramenskoye air base.

The airfield was used as the backup landing site for the Shuttle Buran test program and also as a test base for a Buran's aerodynamic prototype BTS-002.

GFRI periodically hosts the MAKS International Air Show (Aviasalon).

At present, GFRI also hosts Zhukovsky International Airport.

== History ==
=== Foundation ===
The Flight Research Institute was founded on March 8, 1941, in accordance with the decree of Sovnarkom and the Central Committee of the Communist Party of the Soviet Union. Mikhail Gromov, a test pilot, Hero of the Soviet Union, became its first chief. From the very beginning the institute participated in development and testing of aircraft and airborne systems, conducted flight research in order to pave the way to further scientific activities.

The first years of the institute's existence fell on the war times. During the war experts of the institute kept developing recommendations to eliminate defects in flight qualities and war-fighting capabilities of the aircraft, flight testing of the aircraft prototypes, studied the foreign aircraft and equipment, both purchased and taken as trophies.

=== Cold War ===
Zhukovsky airfield was the Soviet Union's equivalent to the US Edwards AFB and as such many types of aircraft underwent evaluation.

Here some western aircraft were tested or analyzed:

- Wrecks from F-111s shot down over North Vietnam were sent to Zhukovskiy to be analyzed.
- Pieces of US planes shot down in North Vietnam and their captured electronic countermeasures equipment were taken for evaluation (F-111, A-6, A-7, B-52, F-4, F105, etc.).
- Captured VNAF helicopters are believed to have been tested (UH-1H, CH-47).

=== Perestroika times ===
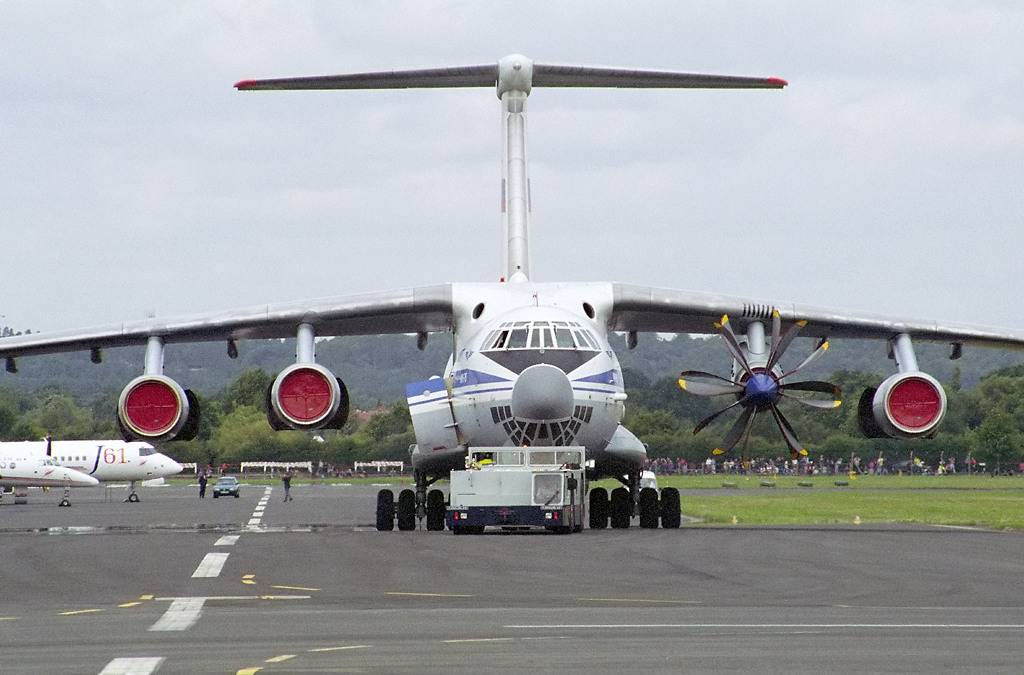
Ilyushin Il-76LL testbed with Progress D-27 engine prototype

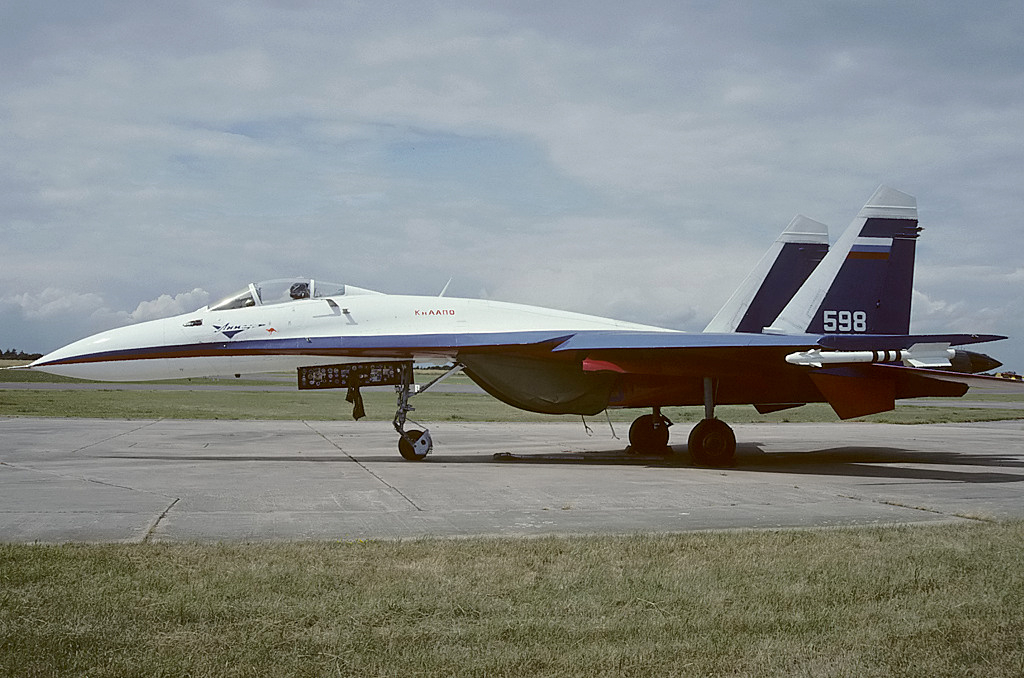
Modified Sukhoi Su-27P aeroplane (1995)

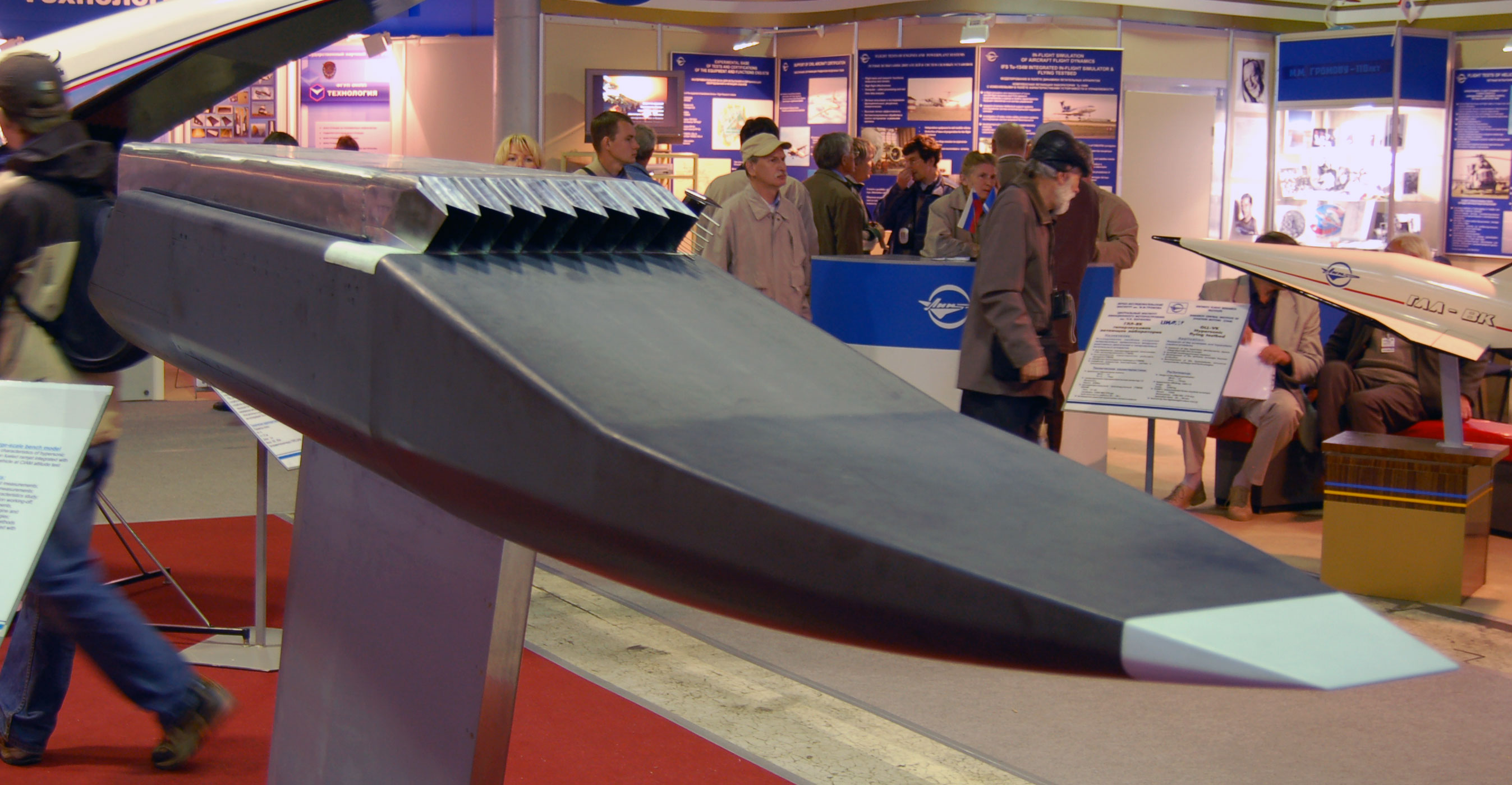
GLL-AP hypersonic scramjet testbed

In 2001 GFRI had a staff of about 5000 then headed by Vyacheslav M. Bakaev. Number of research flying test-beds was about 70 complemented with 20 multipurpose test stands and simulators. The institute also supported Fedotov Test Pilot School. Newly built by AMST of Austria centrifuge then was one of the advanced in the world having a gondola with a 3D visual projection system and formed the core of GFRI's aerospace medical research complex. As said Vilgelm I. Vid (GFRI deputy chief for civil aviation) the institute pioneered a civil aircraft upset recovery system to decrease a number of CFIT accidents originated in aeroplane upsets. However, Bakaev said GFRI was passing through economic difficulties as most Russian aeronautical facilities. The institute was downsized by about 30% since 1996, and most of the test aircraft were underutilized.

Due to financial problems in the 1990s (known as perestroika times), tourist fighter flights in former secret jets became available, mainly for wealthy western tourists. The security check was comparable to the Russian visa. On offer for flights was the Aero L-39 Albatros jet trainer, the Soviet-built Mikoyan-Gurevich MiG-21, Mikoyan-Gurevich MiG-23, MiG-25 for stratosphere "Edge of Space" flights, the MiG-29 Fulcrum and even the Sukhoi Su-27 Flanker. From June 2006, such flights were stopped.

The airline was established by the institute in 1995 as a wholly owned commercial subsidiary and named Gromov Air (later Moskovia Airlines).

== Current research and development activities ==
- Aerospace flight research and testing in low and high speed aerodynamics, flight dynamics, propulsion and avionics technologies (GLL-8 (Gll-VK) Igla).
- Testing and certification services for prototype aircraft and on-board equipment.
- Research in aircraft flight safety, reliability, maintainability and other operating capabilities.
- Fedotov Test Pilot School for training test pilots, navigators, and on-board test engineers.
- Development, production and operation of a variety of flying testbeds including those based on the Tu-154, Su-30, Il-76, Il-103 aeroplanes, Mi-8 helicopters, etc.
- Development and production of flight testing instrumentation (low and high frequency data collection solid state storage systems, vibration parameters measuring devices, instant temperature sensors, miniaturized flat piezoresistance beat and pressure distribution sensors, hot-wire airflow velocity vector transducers and aerodynamic friction stress measurement products, etc.).

== Testbed aeroplanes ==
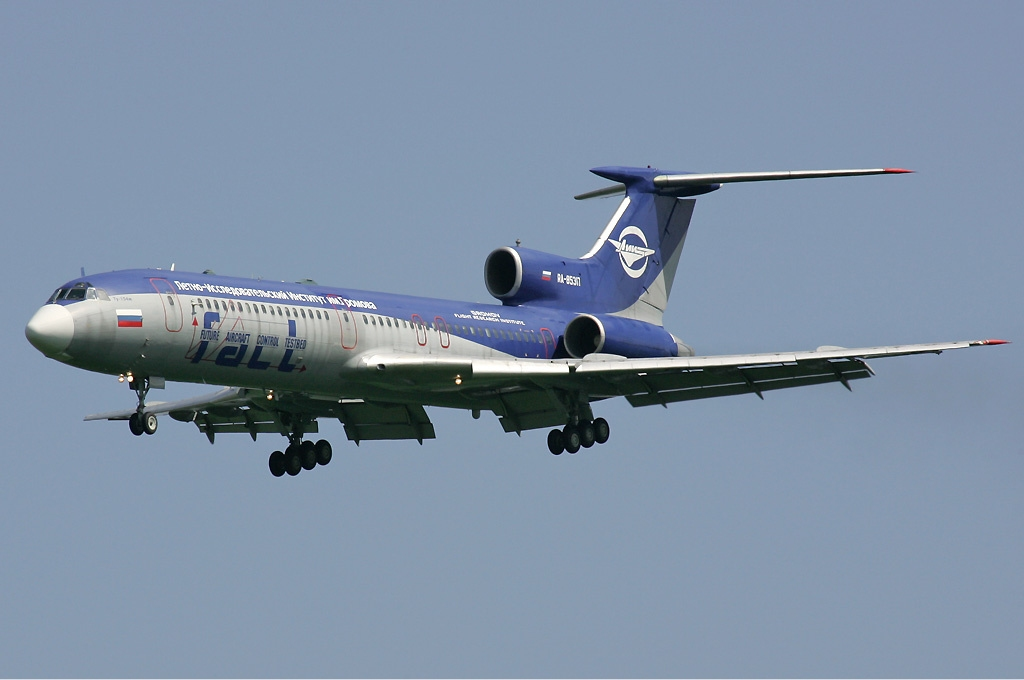
Tupolev Tu-154B/M-based testbed (2010)

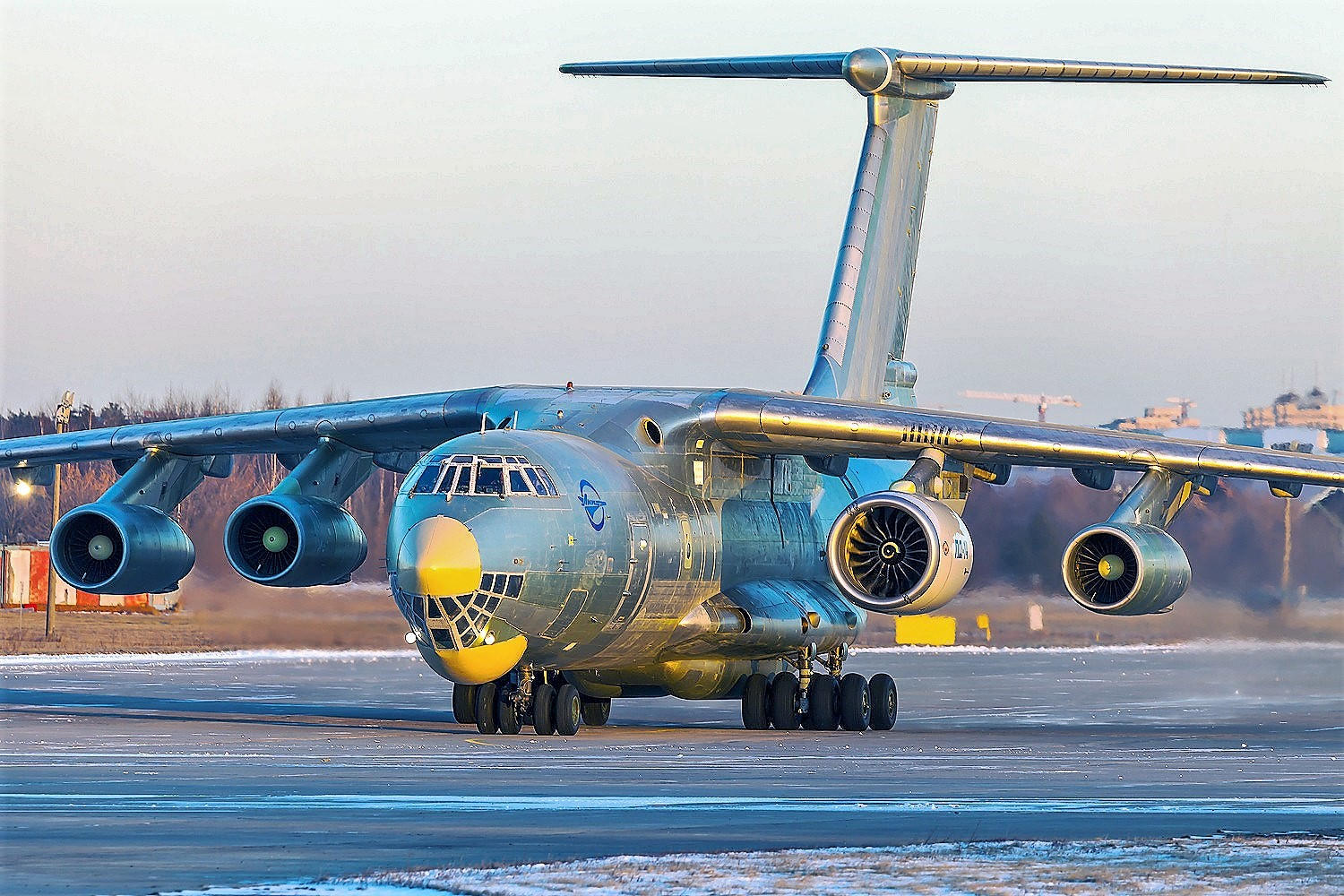
Ilyushin Il-76LL testbed with PD-14 engine prototype (2015)

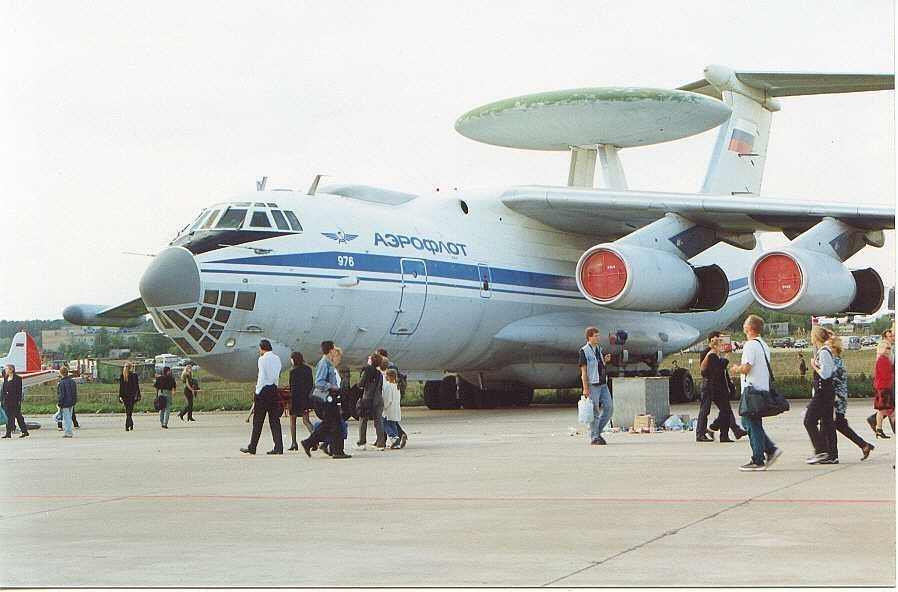
Ilyushin Il-76LL SKIP testbed (1999)

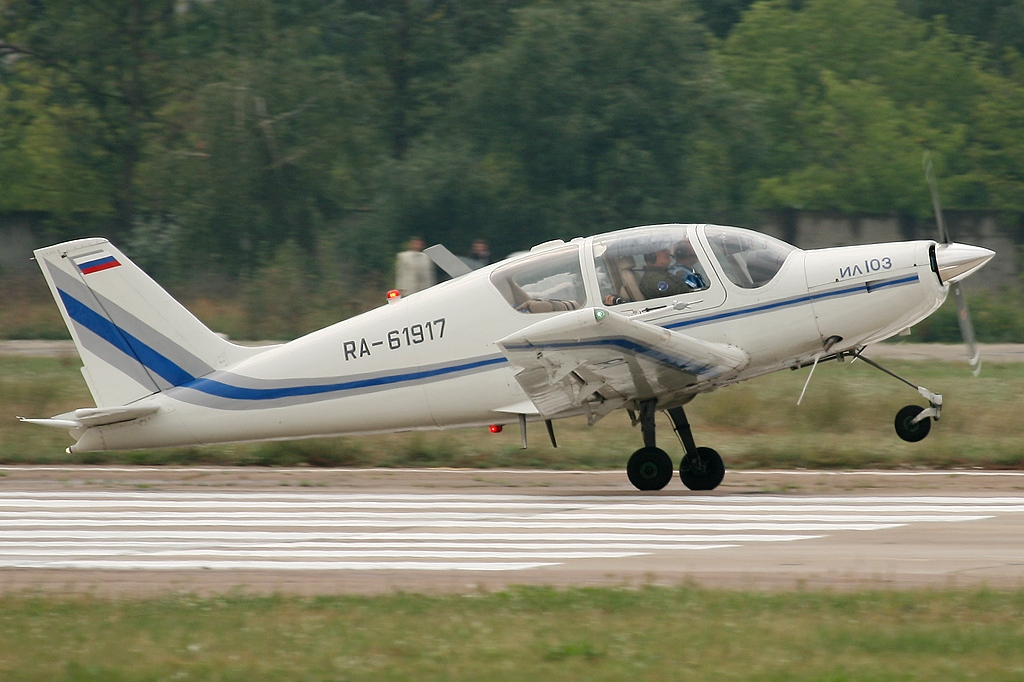
Ilyushin Il-103 testbed (2011)

== Notable employees ==
=== Heads of the institute ===
- Mikhail Gromov (March – August 1941)
- Alexandr Chesalov (1941–1942 and 1943–1947)
- Vasily Molokov (1942–1943)
- Ivan Petrov (1947–1951)
- Alexandr Kobzarev (1951–1954)
- Nickolay Stroev (1954–1966)
- Victor Utkin (1966–1981)
- Arseny Mironov (1981–1985)
- Konstantin Vasilchenko (1985–1995)
- Felix Zolotariev (1995–1998)
- Viacheslav Bakaev (1998–2004)
- Yury Klishin (2005–2006)
- Vadim Shalygin (2006–2007)
- Evgeny Gorbunov (2007–2009)
- Pavel Vlasov (2010–2017)
- Evgeny Pushkarsky (since 2017)

=== Scientists, test pilots, navigators, and engineers ===
- Sergei Anokhin
- Yuri Garnaev
- Anatoly Kvochur
- Viktor Korostiev
- Anatoly Levchenko
- Leonid Lobas
- Guy Severin
- Rimantas Stankevičius
- Amet-khan Sultan
- Ural Sultanov
- Max Taitz
- Igor Volk

== See also ==
- Armstrong Flight Research Center – the USA counterpart of the Gromov Flight Research Institute
- List of aerospace flight test centres
