= Ruben Yesayan =

Russian-Armenian test pilot (1946–2026)

- Ռուբեն Եսայան; Рубен Есаян
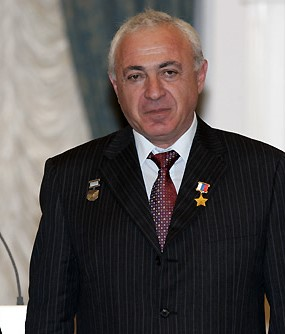
- Yesayan in 2006
- Born: 24 November 1946; Yerevan, Armenian SSR, Soviet Union
- Died: 1 January 2026 (aged 79)
- Occupation: Test pilot
- Awards: Hero of the Russian Federation

Signature
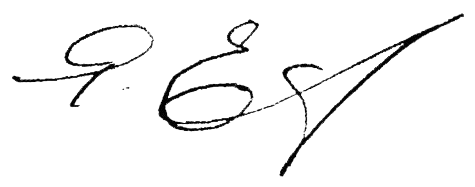

Ruben Tatevosovich Yesayan (Armenian: Ռուբեն Թադևոսի Եսայան, Russian: Рубен Татевосович Есаян; 24 November 1946 – 1 January 2026) was a Russian-Armenian test pilot. He tested several aircraft, including Tupolev Tu-334, Tupolev Tu-154, Ilyushin Il-76MF, Ilyushin Il-96 and Ilyushin Il-114, and received the title of the Hero of the Russian Federation.

== Life and career ==
Yesayan was born on 24 November 1946, in Yerevan, then in the Soviet Union. He graduated from Sasovo Flight Academy and Civil Aviation Academy. In 1987 he has completed training as a test pilot in the Fedotov Test Pilot School.

In 2013, Yesayan, together with other Russian test pilots, signed an open letter to Vladimir Putin, criticizing the United Aircraft Corporation for not producing civilian airliners and outlining other shortcomings in the Russian aviation industry.

In 2014, Yesayan's crew landed Tu-154 aircraft on the short runway of a Samara training airfield, where Tu-154 have never landed before.

=== Comments about Malaysia Airlines Flight 17 ===
Following the Malaysia Airlines Flight 17 incident, Yesayan, alongside another test pilot Magomed Tolboyev, criticized the Russian version about the airliner's shootdown by a Ukrainian Sukhoi Su-25 aircraft: "Someone, unfamiliar with Su-25's capabilities and the Boeing-777 aircraft, is trying a PR stunt. This is a natural bluff. [...] Su-25 has a maximum airspeed of Mach 0.82. The Boeing-777 aircraft, which I tested in 1998 in Seattle, flies at Mach 0.83 in a cruise flight. Thus, a Su-25 would not be able to catch up with it at all". Yesayan also noted that the Su-25 air-to-air missiles are heat-seeking and would strike the engine, while the Malaysia Airlines Flight 17 Boeing was damaged on the cockpit side.

=== Death ===
Yesayan died on 1 January 2025, at the age of 79.

== See also ==
- List of Heroes of the Russian Federation
