= Aleksandr Gudov =

Alexander Gudov
- Born: September 16, 1932; Svinets village, Kursk Oblast
- Died: July 11, 2004 (aged 71); Kyiv, Ukraine
- Military career
- Allegiance: Soviet Union Ukraine
- Rank: Captain
- Awards: Honoured Test Pilot of the USSR

Alexander Gudov (16 September 1932 — 7 November 2004) — Honoured Test Pilot of the USSR (1984), captain (1978).

== Biography ==
Gudov was born in Svinets village of Kursk Oblast and was raised in an orphanage.

During World War II he witnessed an air battle, which inspired him to become a pilot – while still a child, he made a tattoo on his wrist in the form of an airplane.

Having graduated from the Sasovo Flight School of the Civil Air Fleet, he moves to Kiev and joins the Kiev United Air Squadron (Aeroflot).

1957 - 1986 - a test pilot of the Kiev aircraft factory.

Tested head planes: An-24 (31.01.1962, 2-nd pilot), An-26 (22.06.1969), and An-30 (12.03.1973, 2-nd pilot).

Was testing serial planes: An-2 (1957-1963), An-24 (1962-1979), An-26 (1969-1986), An-30 (1973-1978), An-32 (1983-1986) and their modifications.

Died on November 7, 2004, in Kyiv. Was buried in Kyiv at Berkovets Cemetery.

== Awards ==
- Honoured Test Pilot of the USSR

== Sources ==
- Александр Константинович Гудов // А.А. Симонов - Заслуженные испытатели СССР, М.: Авиамир, 2009 - С. 66-67
