= Yuri Abramovich =

Yuri Garrievich Abramovich
- Юрий Гарриевич Абрамович
- Born: 5 September 1935; Kharkiv, Ukrainian SSR, USSR
- Died: 28 February 2017 (aged 81); Zhukovsky, Moscow Oblast, Russia
- Military career
- Allegiance: Soviet Union
- Branch: Soviet Air Force
- Rank: Senior lieutenant
- Awards: Hero of the Russian Federation

Yuri Garrievich Abramovich (Russian: Юрий Гарриевич Абрамович; 5 September 1935 in Kharkiv, Ukrainian SSR – 28 February 2017 in Zhukovsky, Moscow Oblast, Russia) was a test pilot of the Moscow Aviation Industrial Association (MAIA).

Abramovich graduated from Moscow Aviation Institute in 1959. From 1965 to 1995 Abramovich worked as a test pilot at aviation enterprise "Znamya Truda" (now named MAIA) in Lukhovitsy town in Moscow Oblast. He tested several supersonic fighter aircraft Mikoyan-Gurevich MiG-21, Mikoyan-Gurevich MiG-23, Mikoyan MiG-29 and their modifications, and participated in testing the Ilyushin Il-103 light multipurpose aircraft.

On 1 March 1996 Abramovich was awarded the title Hero of the Russian Federation "for courage and heroism shown during the testing of new aviation technology".

He lived in the city of Zhukovsky, Moscow Oblast, and works as deputy head of the aviation testing complex of MAIA for flight work. He was an ethnic Jew.

== Awards ==
- Hero of the Russian Federation (1 March 1996)
- Order of the Red Banner of Labour, twice (26 April 1971, 11 October 1974)
- Order of the Badge of Honour (31 July 1961)
- Jubilee Medal "In Commemoration of the 100th Anniversary since the Birth of Vladimir Il'ich Lenin"
- Medal "Veteran of Labour"
- Honoured Test Pilot of the USSR

== See also ==
- List of Heroes of the Russian Federation
