= Sergei Anokhin (test pilot) =

Soviet test pilot (1910-1986)

Sergey Anokhin
- Сергей Анохин
- Born: 1 April [O.S. 19 March] 1910; Moscow, Russian Empire
- Died: 15 April 1986; Moscow, USSR
- Military career
- Allegiance: Soviet Union
- Branch: Soviet Air Force
- Service years: 1941 – 1964
- Rank: Colonel
- Conflicts: World War II
- Awards: Hero of the Soviet Union; Honoured Test Pilot of the USSR; Stalin Prize

Signature
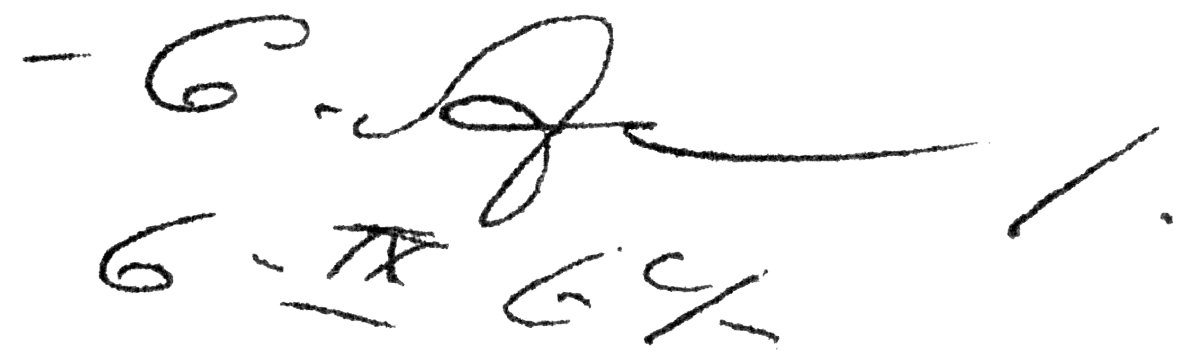

Sergey Nikolaevich Anokhin (Russian: Серге́й Никола́евич Ано́хин; 1 April [O.S. 19 March] 1910 – 15 April 1986) was a Soviet Air Forces officer and a test pilot serving in the Soviet space program.

== Early life and education ==
Sergei Anokhin was born in Moscow on 19 March 1910. He worked on the railroads until the 1930s when he enrolled at a Higher Air Force School. From there, he became a glider pilot, instructor and established numerous world records for gliding flights.

During its one and only flight on 2 September 1942, Anokhin piloted the Antonov A-40, an experimental Soviet glider T-60 tank. After being released by the tow aircraft, he landed the tank glider to a field near the airport, and after dropping the glider wings and tail, the T-60 was driven back to its base. However, due to the lack of a sufficiently-powerful aircraft to tow the tank at the required speed of 160 km/h (99 mph), the project was abandoned. In World War II, Anokhin assumed command of an Air Force regiment in Belarus.

== Test pilot and space program ==
In 1943, Anokhin joined the Flight Research Institute and become the lead test pilot for the first type of Soviet developed jet propelled airplane. Through this, he became one of the most popular test pilots in the Soviet Air Force. Despite having lost his left eye in after a serious accident while flying a Yak-3 on 17 May 1945, he continued to work as a test pilot. From 1951 to 1953, he along with Amet-khan Sultan, Fyodor Burtsev, and Vasily Pavlov flew manned tests of the KS-1 Komet, for which he was awarded the Stalin prize.

He was awarded the title Hero of the Soviet Union on 3 February 1953, the highest commendation in the Soviet Union. In 1959, he became the Soviet Union's first Merited Test Pilot of the Soviet Union. In July and August 1964, Anokhin was commissioned to test specific airlock designs for what would become future Soviet spacecraft, specifically for the spacecraft sent on the Voskhod 2 mission. Also in 1964, Anokhin was selected by Sergey Korolev to be the head of a team to train civilian cosmonauts, rather than military that they had been prior. Under him, seven people were selected for training. These people included Konstantin Feoktistov, Georgy Grechko, Valery Kubasov, Oleg Makarov, Nikolai Rukavishnikov, Vladislav Volkov, and Valery Yazdovsky. These men were collectively known in the Soviet Space program as “Korolev’s Kindergarten”. After training these men, they were brought into various Soviet missions as engineers and scientists at the discretion of Anokhin. Eventually, Anokhin himself was denied becoming an active cosmonaut for later missions due to health problems. He worked in the administration of the Soviet space program until his retirement in 1978.

== Later life ==
Anokhin died on 15 April 1986 and is buried in Novodevichy cemetery in Moscow.
