= Burtsev =

Burtsev (Russian: Бурцев) is a Russian male surname. Its feminine counterpart is Burtseva. Notable people with the surname include:

- Fyodor Burtsev (1923–2003), Soviet test pilot
- Mikhail Burtsev (1956–2015), Russian fencer
- Roman Burtsev (1971–2023), Russian serial killer and pedophile
- Vladimir Burtsev (1862–1942), Russian revolutionary activist, scholar, publisher, and editor
