= Fedotov Test Pilot School =

Test pilot school in USSR and Russia

- Native name: Школа лётчиков-испытателей имени А. В. Федотова
- Company type: division
- Industry: aerospace
- Founded: 1947; 79 years ago
- Founder: Mikhail Gromov
- Headquarters: Zhukovsky, Russia
- Area served: Europe and Asia
- Key people: Alexey V. Naumov, Chief of the school
- Owner: Russian Federation
- Parent: Gromov Flight Research Institute
- Website: TPS section at the GFRI site (in Russian)

External image
- The Fedotov TPS building with a nearby MiG-21 testbed aircraft monument

The Fedotov Test Pilot School or FTPS (Russian: Школа лётчиков-испытателей имени А. В. Федотова or Russian: ШЛИ) is one of two test pilot schools in Russia (the other one is a military test pilot school in Akhtubinsk). The school was established in 1947 when Russia was part of the USSR and is named after Aleksandr Vasilyevich Fedotov, a test pilot who was killed in an aircraft crash in the 1980s.

== History ==
The school was established in 1947 at the Soviet Union's Gromov Flight Research Institute in Zhukovsky near Moscow, to train personnel involved in conducting test flights primarily within the Russian aviation industry. They underwent theoretical and practical training to allow safe and effective flight testing of the aircraft and on-board equipment. Initially there were three departments: for training test pilots for fixed-wing and rotary wing aircraft; and air navigators to be employed by the Soviet design bureaus (OKB), research institutes (like GFRI, etc.) and production plants. Later, with completion of the initial training schedules, such separation became less formalized. There also were special classes for training test pilots to serve as civil aviation research and testing personnel working for the GosNII GA.

The school is named after Aleksandr Vasilyevich Fedotov. The school was named in 1984 after Fedotov died in a test flight accident that year.

Alexandr Krutov, then chief of the school, told in his interview (2018) that in the Soviet times the school trainee were selected mostly in the Air Force. The flight service department at the ministry of aviation industry knew how many test pilots would be needed for the entire industry. When pilots were studying, they did not know where they would work: at the aircraft plant, or at the Flight Research Institute, or in OKB. Currently, pilots are taken sent to study at the school by their employer which is less effective. Generally any company-employer choose a person having an apartment to live, with local residence permit, who already has everything, but not by the fact that he is the best pilot. Earlier, in Soviet Air Force, there were two or three divisions, each of three regiments, and from each regiment one person was chosen as a candidate for enrolling. The division chose the best one and finally the school received about 12 people. That time the best of the best studied at the state expense. Now the education is paid by the pilot's employer. Training of one person costs from 5 to 20 million rubles.

== Training ==
Currently, FTPS is licensed by the ministry of education as an additional professional education establishment and provides training for test pilots and navigators, flight test engineers and operators involved in flight testing, as well as the air traffic controllers and maintenance engineers. The course curriculum for aircrew training is divided into two major components: theory of flight and flight testing; simulators and flight training.

Fixed and rotary wing aircraft are available for training from the fleet of the Gromov Flight Research Institute. International students who have attended the course or subsets of the full course include mostly pilots, from China, France, Laos, the United Kingdom and the United States.

== Heads of the school ==
- Mikhail Kotelnikov (1947–1953)
- Nickolay Darsky (1954–1955)
- Ivan Polunin (1955–1961)
- Alexandr Rozanov (1961–1969)
- Lev Fomenko (1970–1974)
- Fyodor Burtsev (1974–1988)
- Vladislav Loychikov (1988–1989)
- Vladimir Kondratenko (1989–2012)
- Alexandr Krutov (2013–2020)
- Alexey Naumov (since 2020)

== Notable alumni (partial list) ==
See also Category:Fedotov TPS alumni

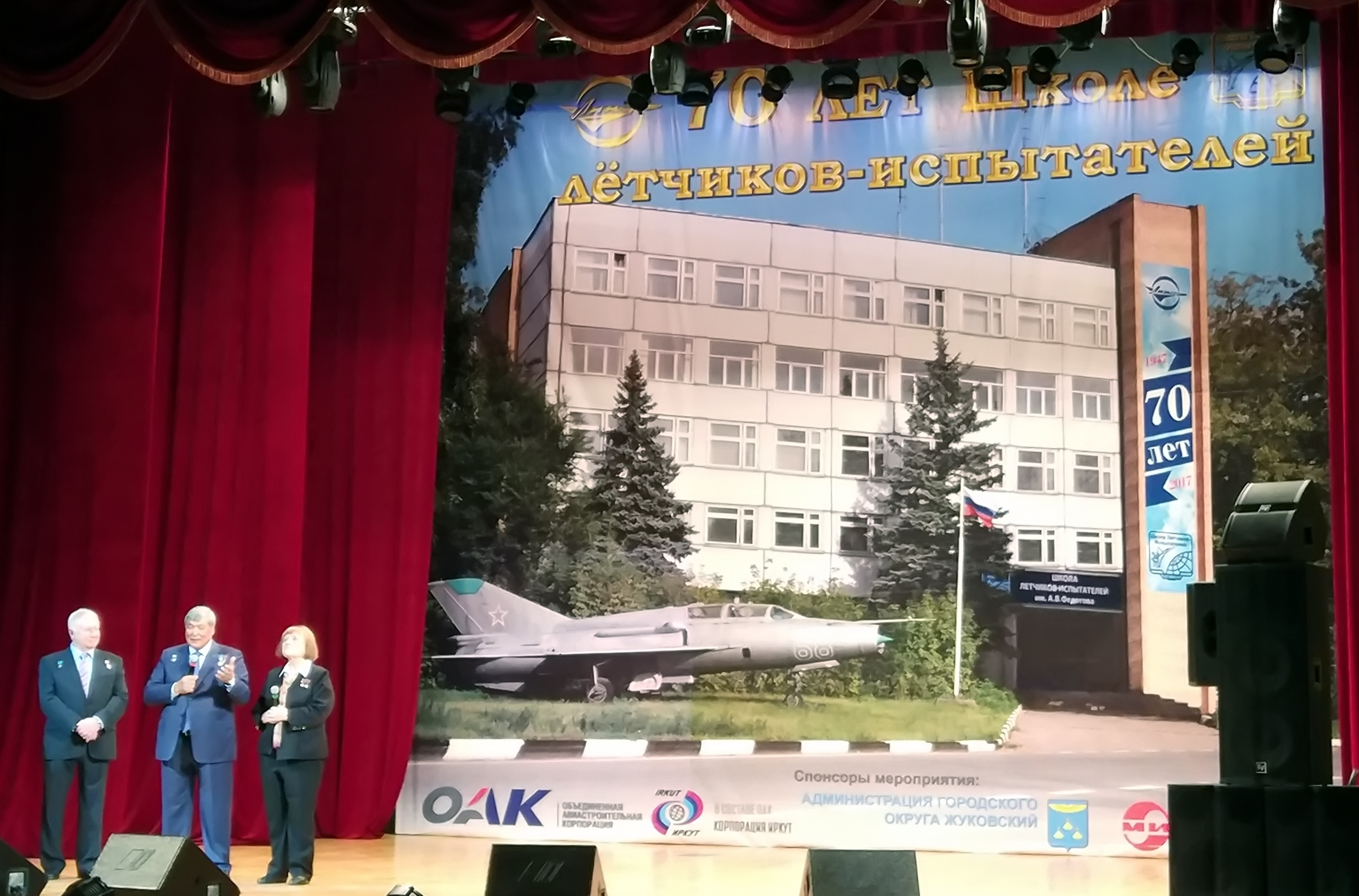
Аlexandr Krutov, Toktar Aubakirov and Svetlana Savitskaya (left to right) at the celebration of the 70th anniversary of the Fedotov TPS

- Toktar Aubakirov
- Anatoly Kvochur
- Viktor Korostiyev
- Anatoli Levchenko
- Leonid Lobas
- Vladislav Loychikov
- Aleksander Shchukin
- Svetlana Savitskaya
- Rimantas Stankevičius
- Ural Sultanov
- Pavel Vlasov
- Igor Volk
- Ruben Yesayan

== See also ==
- List of test pilot schools
- Category:Fedotov TPS alumni
