= Fyodor Burtsev =

Soviet test pilot

Fyodor Ivanovich Burtsev
- Фёдор Иванович Бурцев
- Born: 27 June 1923; Kazaki village, Tula Governorate, RSFSR, USSR
- Died: 4 May 2003 (aged 79); Moscow, Russian Federation
- Military career
- Allegiance: Soviet Union
- Branch: Soviet Air Force
- Service years: 1941–1980
- Rank: Air Force Colonel
- Conflicts: World War II
- Awards: Hero of the Soviet Union; Honored Test Pilot of the USSR

Fyodor Ivanovich Burtsev (Russian: Фёдор Иванович Бурцев; 27 June 1923 – 4 May 2003) was a decorated test pilot of the Gromov Flight Research Institute. A recipient of the titles Hero of the Soviet Union and Honored Test Pilot of the USSR for his career as a test pilot, he went on to serve as head of the Fedotov Test Pilot School from 1974 to 1988.

== Early life ==
Burtsev was born on 27 June 1923 to a working-class Russian family in Kazaki village, located within present-day Tula oblast. In 1932 he moved to Moscow, where in 1940 he graduated from his eighth grade of school in addition to the local aeroclub named after Lenin before joining the military in January 1941. Upon graduating from the Borisoglebsk Military Aviation School of Pilots in November that year, he went on to serve as a flight instructor at the school until March 1942, and subsequently until June 1943 he served as an instructor pilot in the 2nd Separate Training Aviation Regiment, based in the Moscow Military District. Later he was briefly deployed to the frontline of the war, during which he flew 57 sorties on the La-5 fighter and gained one solo aerial shootdown, having been assigned to the 32nd Guards Fighter Aviation Regiment in September to October 1943 and then the 111th Guards Fighter Aviation Regiment until November that year. Until 1948 he served as an instructor pilot at the newly established Higher School of Aerial Combat for the RKKA Air Force officers in Lyubertsy (Moscow Region), although he briefly left in mid 1944 for combat training with the 322nd Fighter Aviation Division.

== Test pilot career ==
Upon graduating from test pilot school in 1950, Burtsev became a test pilot at the Gromov Flight Research Institute. From 1951 to 1952 he took part in manned tests of the KS-1 Komet, an anti-ship air-to-surface missile along with Amet-khan Sultan, Sergey Anokhin, and Vasily Pavlov, for which they each received the Stalin Prize 2nd class in 1953. After the Komet tests he went on to test a variety of fighter jets, and in February 1955 he became the first to take off in the MiG I-370/I-1; he went on to conduct a numerous aerodynamics tests on the MiG-15, MiG-17, MiG-19, MiG-21, E-4, E-5, and E-6, in addition to refueling system tests on the MiG-15 and MiG-17, and stability tests on the MiG-15 at supersonic speed. He also participated in tests of prototype engines on Tu-4LL and Tu-16LL flying laboratories as well as tests of an automatic approach system on an Il-18. For his work as a test pilot he was awarded a variety of high honors including the title Honoured Test Pilot of the USSR in 1964 and Hero of the Soviet Union in 1966.

== Later life ==
Having had a successful career as a test pilot at the Gromov Flight Research Institute, Burtsev went on to serve as head of the Fedotov Test Pilot School from 1974 to 1988, although he formally retired from active duty in the air force with the rank of colonel in March 1980. In 2001 he moved to Moscow from Zhukovsky, where he died on 2 May 2003 and was buried in the Danilovskoye cemetery.

== Memorials ==
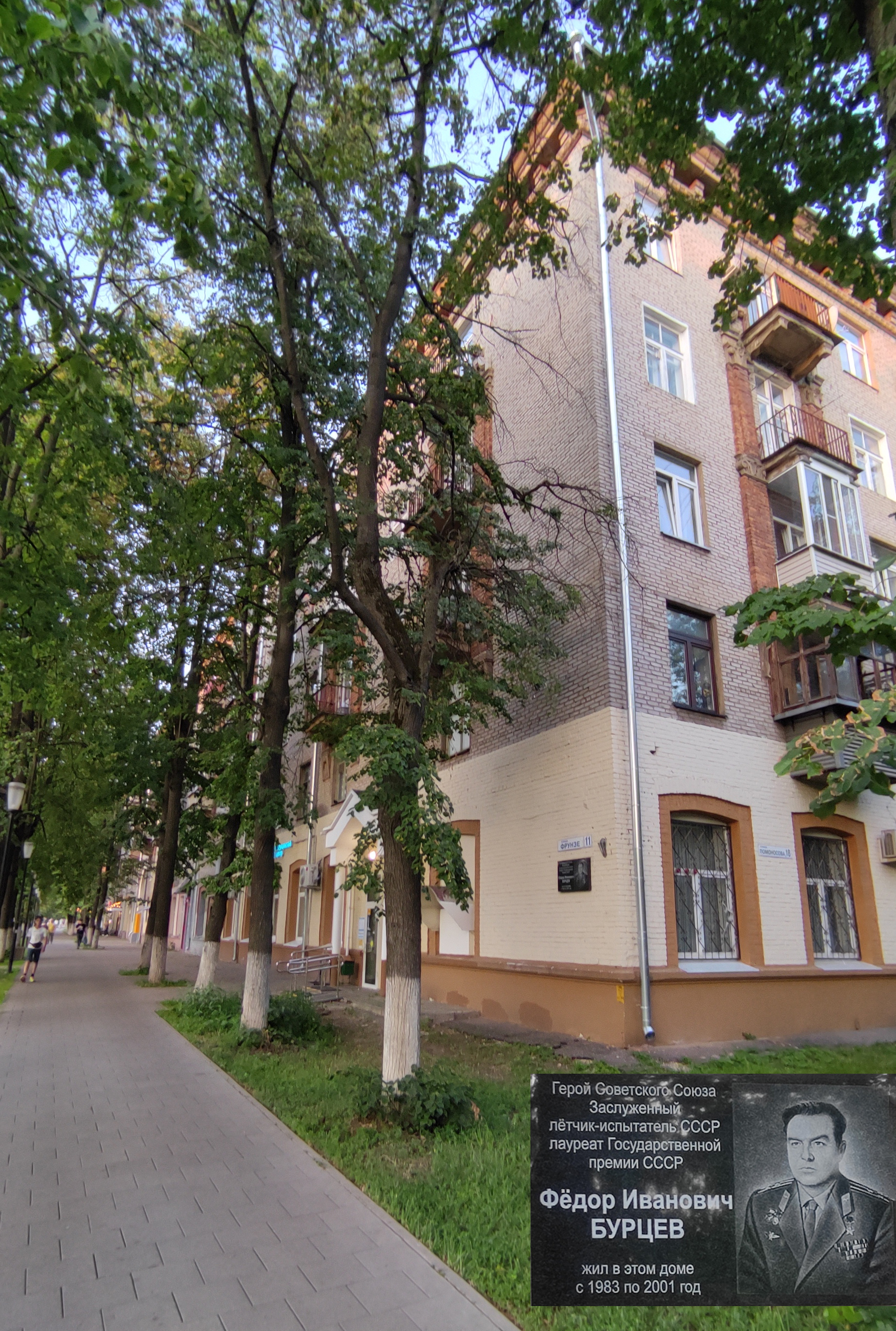
House 11 at Frunze Street in Zhukovsky where Burtsev lived, commemorative plaque later installed

- On the centennial anniversary of Burtsev a commemorative plaque was installed on the wall of the house at 11 Frunze Street in Zhukovsky where he lived

== Awards ==
- Hero of the Soviet Union (22 July 1966)
- Order of Lenin (22 July 1966)
- Honored Test Pilot of the USSR (21 August 1964)
- Stalin Prize 2nd class (1953)
- Order of the October Revolution (25 March 1974)
- Two Order of the Red Banner (20 September 1947 and 3 February 1953)
- Order of the Patriotic War 1st class (11 March 1985)
- Three Order of the Red Star (10 July 1944, 2 August 1944, 30 December 1956)
