= Pavel Vlasov =

Russian Test Pilot, Hero of the Russian Federation

- Павел Власов
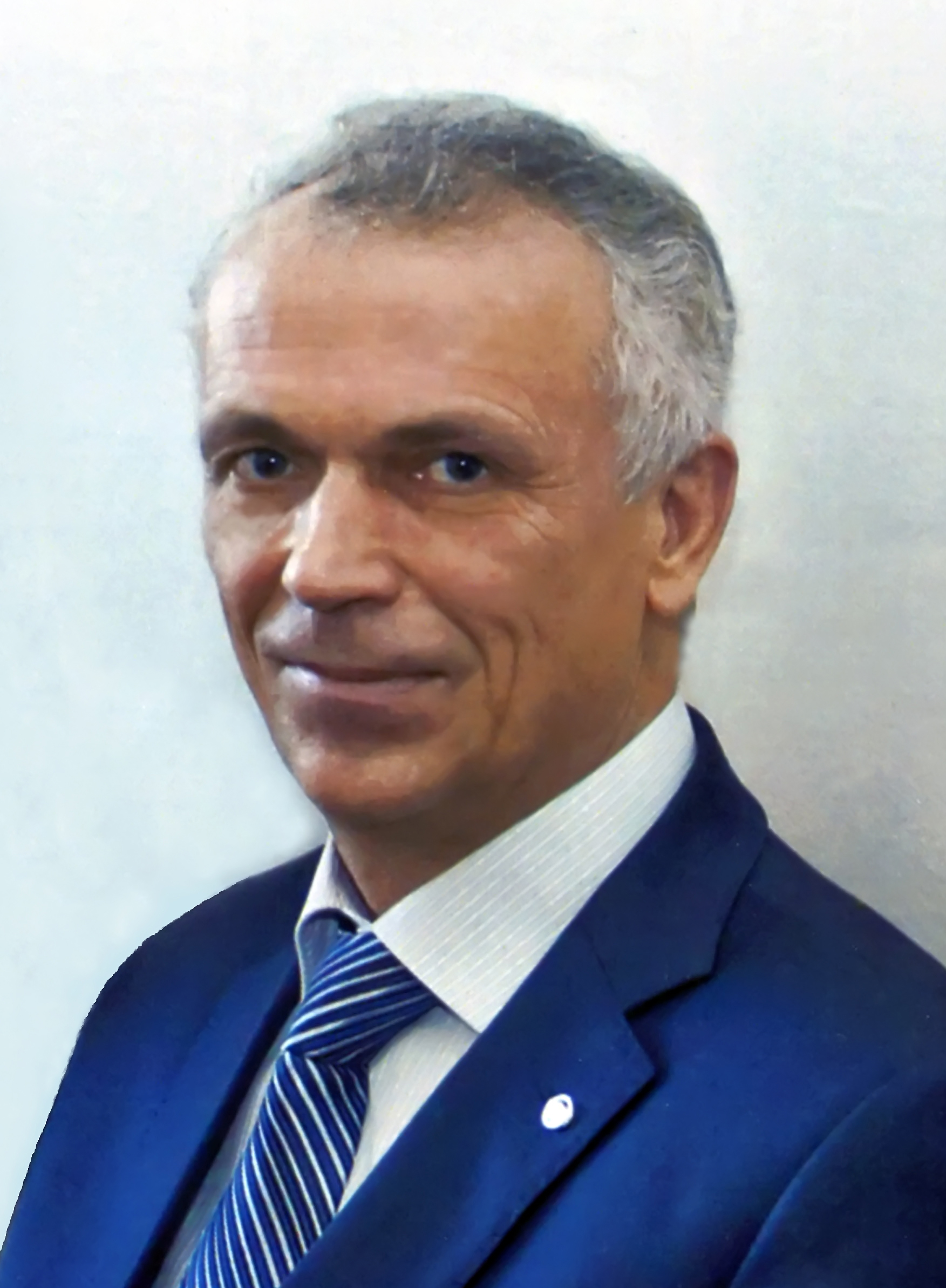
- Vlasov in 2011
- Born: 13 October 1960 (age 64); Lebedyn, UkrSSR
- Citizenship: Russia
- Education: Gritsevets Military Aviation Higher School of Pilots (1981); Fedotov Test Pilot School (1989); Moscow School of Management SKOLKOVO (2010)
- Alma mater: Gritsevets Military Aviation Higher School of Pilots (1981)
- Occupations: Soviet Air Force pilot; Test pilot; Engineer; General manager
- Years active: 1981–2021
- Employer(s): MiG Corporation (1989–2010) Gromov Flight Research Institute (2010–2017); Gagarin Cosmonaut Training Centre (2017–2021)
- Known for: Maiden flights and flight testing of the carrier-based MiG-29K fighter and thrust-vectoring version of the MiG-29 (MiG-29OVT), 15th director of the Gromov Flight Research Institute (2010–2017)
- Children: 2
- Awards: Hero of the Russian Federation (1998)
- Aviation career
- First flight: May 1978; L-39
- Famous flights: solo aerobatic in MiG-29OVT
- Flight license: 1981; Okhtyrka, USSR
- Air force: Soviet
- Rank: Captain

Pavel Nikolaevich Vlasov (Russian: Павел Николаевич Власов; born 13 October 1960) is a Russian test pilot, engineer, one of the Gromov Flight Research Institute directors (2010–2017), chief of the Gagarin Cosmonaut Training Centre (2017–2021) and Hero of the Russian Federation.

== Biography ==
=== Early years and military service ===
Vlasov was born on October 13, 1960, in the city of Lebedyn in the Ukrainian SSR (current Ukraine). He graduated high school with a gold medal and in 1977 he entered the Gritsevets Military Aviation Higher School of Pilots.

He trained there with Aero L-39 and MIG-21 aircraft and graduated with a "red diploma" in 1981.

Upon graduation Vlasov was assigned to serve as a flight instructor and trained military pilots in the same flight school. In 1987 he was selected for test pilot training at the Fedotov Test Pilot School.

=== Aerospace industry ===
Upon graduation from the Fedotov Test Pilot School in 1989 Vlasov worked for the MiG Corporation as a test pilot and as a deputy director general for flight testing (2002–2010). He participated in flight testing of MiG-31 heavy interceptor, accomplished maiden flights and flight testing of the carrier-based MiG-29K fighter and thrust-vectoring version of MiG-29 (MiG-29OVT), MiG-29M/M2 and MiG-35 fighters and the MiG-AT trainer. Vlasov is type rated for 35 types of aircraft.

As an aerobatics pilot he flew demonstration flights at international air shows in the UK, Germany, India, the United Arab Emirates, Poland, France and Slovakia, and was awarded several times for his skills.

He headed the Gromov Flight Research Institute from January 2010, while keeping his position in the MiG Corporation until February 2014. In 2010, he completed the United Aircraft Corporation strategic personnel reserve programme in the Moscow School of Management SKOLKOVO. Vlasov worked as head of the Gromov Institute during its transformation into a public company, and became its Director General in 2012.

In November 2017 he became the head of the Gagarin Cosmonaut Training Centre where worked until retirement on 1 June 2021.

TASS reported that in 2023 Vlasov worked at United Aircraft Corporation as an advisor to the President of the corporation.

In August 2024 he was in a position of an advisor to the Roscosmos Director General and reportedly was one of the main candidates for the new position of the Roscosmos Deputy Director General for manned and automated spacecraft.

=== Family ===
In 1986, Vlasov married Elena Pavlovna Vlasova, a teacher of chemistry and biology. Together they have a daughter Anna (born 1987) and a son Andrey (born 1993).

== Awards and decorations ==
- Hero of the Russian Federation (1998)
- Order of Courage (1996)
- Merited Test Pilot of the Russian Federation (2003)
- Honoured Aircraft Engineer of the Russian Federation
- Golden Idea National Award (2004)
- Golden Chariot Transport Award (2007)

== See also ==
- List of Heroes of the Russian Federation
