= GLL-8 (Gll-VK) Igla =

Russian hypersonic aircraft

GLL-8 (GLL-VK), nicknamed "Igla" (eng. needle), is a Russian hypersonic flight flying laboratory. It saw its first flight in 2005. It is part of Russia's ongoing ORYOL-2-1 research programme. Under ORYOL-2-1, the Gromov Flight Research Institute in Moscow has developed two possible Igla designs, and is leading an SSTO spaceplane effort and a two-stage-to-orbit design conceived to build a "Mir-2" space station.

== Purpose ==
The purpose of this "flying laboratory" is technical data study of hypersonic speeds, which cannot be done with average engines, and other crewed experimental flight-craft. This study includes the following:

- Aerodynamic properties at hyper sonic speeds
- Maneuverability at different speeds
- G-force effects on fuselage at high speeds
- Scramjet studies

== Vehicles associated with the GLL-8 ==
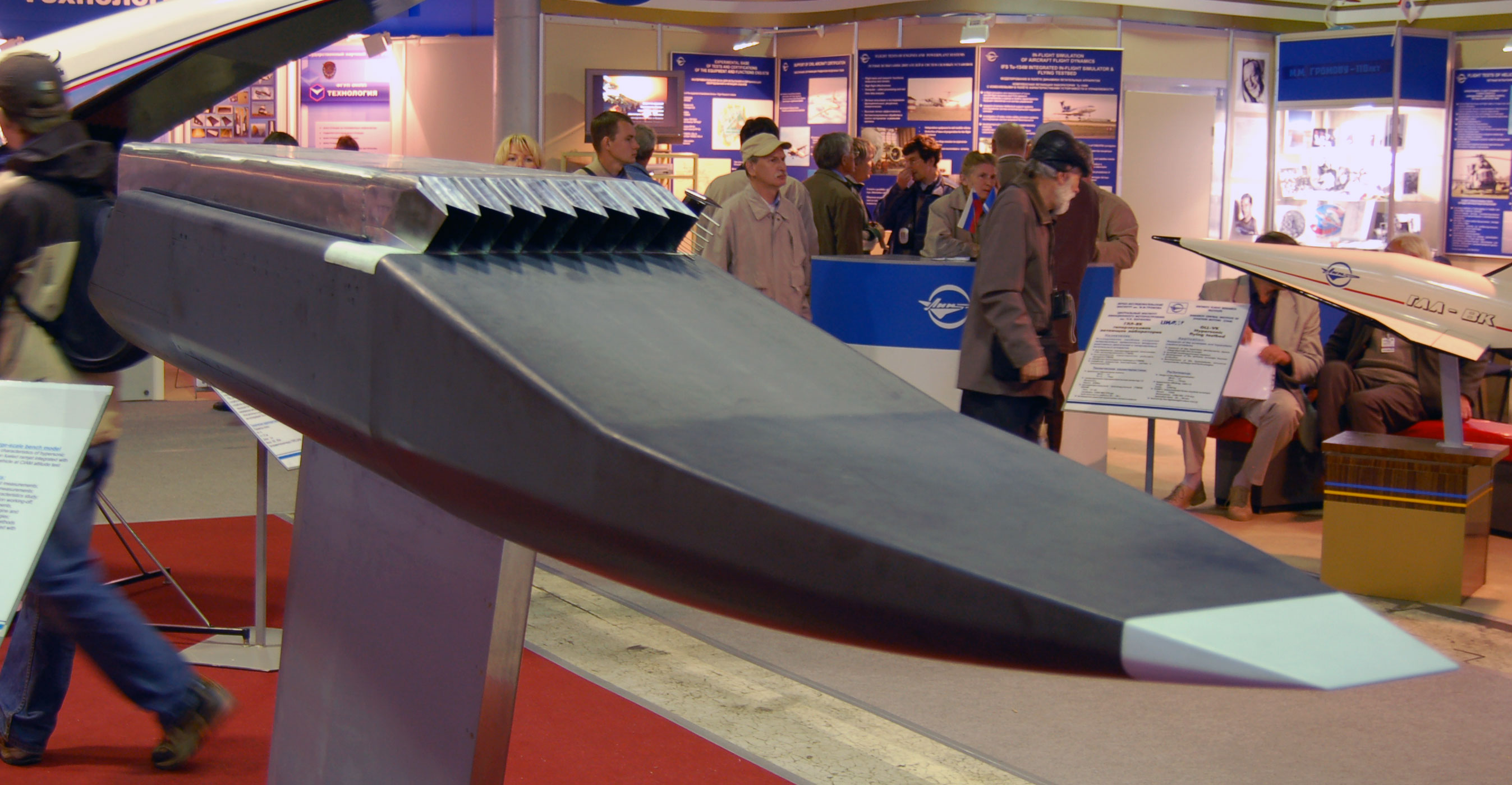
GLL-AP

| Vehicle | Speed | Altitude | Length | Mass | Firing duration | Details |
|---|---|---|---|---|---|---|
| GLL-31 | Mach 2-9 | 18–35 km | 8 m | 3,800 kg | 50 s | Aircraft dropped, hydrogen-fueled scramjet engine |
| GLL-8 (GLL-VK) | Mach 15 | 70 km | 8 m | 2,200 kg | 20-50 s | Rocket-launched, hydrogen-fueled three-mode scramjet engine |
| GLL-AP-02 | Mach 6 | 27 km | 3 m | 550–600 kg | Missing data | Hydrocarbon-based fueled ramjet prototype for high-altitude test stand tests |
