= Igor Volk =

Soviet/Russian test pilot and cosmonaut (1937–2017)

- Игорь Волк; Ігор Волк
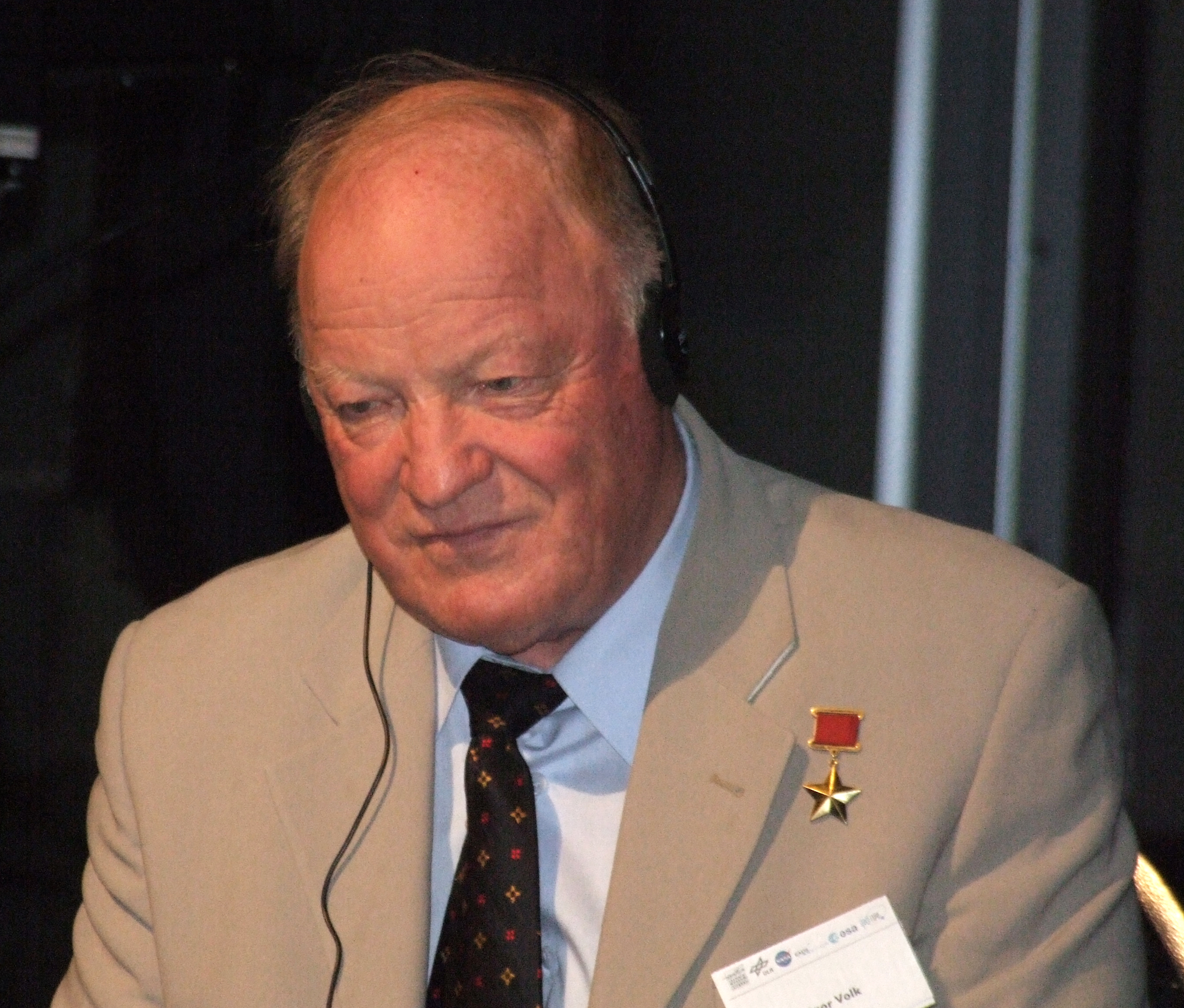
- Volk in 2008
- Born: Igor Petrovich Volk; 12 April 1937; Zmiiv, Kharkiv Oblast, Ukrainian SSR, USSR
- Died: 3 January 2017 (aged 79); Plovdiv, Bulgaria
- Education: Kirovograd Military Aviation School of Pilots (1956); Fedotov Test Pilot School (1965); Moscow Aviation Institute (1969)
- Occupations: test pilot, cosmonaut
- Years active: 1956 – 2016
- Employer: Gromov Flight Research Institute (1965-2002)
- Notable work: MiG-21I testbed maiden flight OK-GLI program
- Awards: Hero of the Soviet Union; Honoured Test Pilot of the USSR
- Space career

Cosmonaut
- Time in space: 11d 19h 14min
- Selection: Air Force Group 5
- Missions: Soyuz T-12

Signature
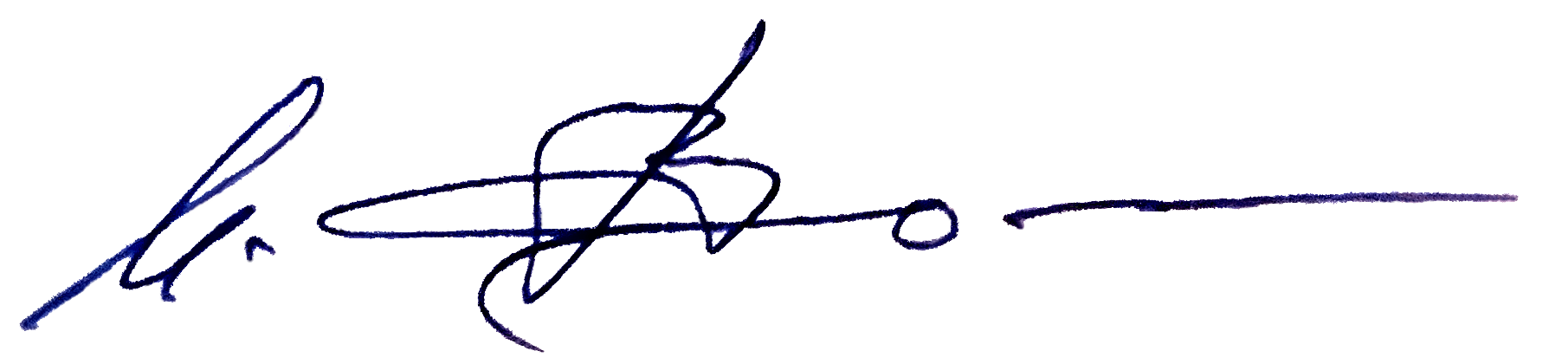

Igor Petrovich Volk (Russian: Игорь Петрович Волк, Ukrainian: Ігор Петрович Волк; 12 April 1937 – 3 January 2017) was a Soviet test pilot and cosmonaut in the Buran programme.

== Military and test pilot ==
Volk became a pilot in the Soviet Air Forces in 1956 and was in active service till 1963. After graduation from the Fedotov Test Pilot School in 1965, he joined the Gromov Flight Research Institute. He logged over 7000 flight hours in over 80 different aircraft types. Over the years, he flew on all types of Soviet fighters, bombers, and transport aircraft. He showed outstanding abilities in complex tests of various airplanes at critical angles of attack, stall, and spin. He was the first to test aircraft behavior at high super-critical angles of attack (around 90°) and performed aerobatics such as the "cobra" maneuver.

== Space program ==
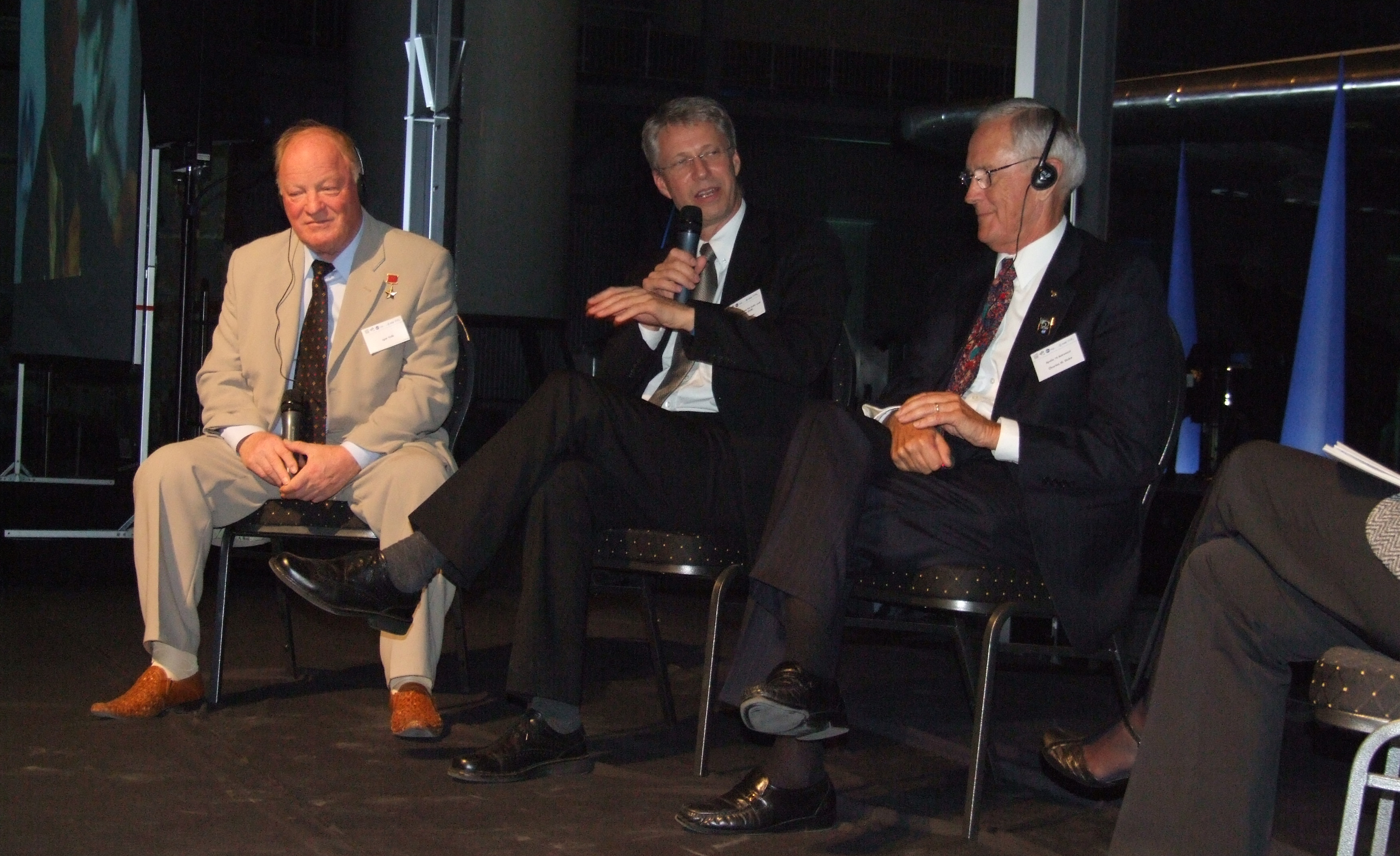
Cosmonaut Igor Volk, European Astronaut Thomas Reiter, U.S. Astronaut Charlie Duke

Volk was selected as a cosmonaut on 12 July 1977 and subsequently assigned to the Buran programme. As part of his preparations for a space shuttle flight, he also accomplished test-flights with Buran's counterpart OK-GLI aircraft.

In July 1984, Volk flew aboard Soyuz T-12, intended to give him some experience in space. With Volks's participation as research cosmonaut on the 7th expedition to Salyut 7, one goal of the mission was to evaluate the effects of long-duration spaceflight on a pilot's skills and ability to fly and land an aeroplane safely (in order to prove Volk's ability to control Space Shuttle Buran atmospheric segment of flight). At the time of the Soyuz T-12 mission, the Buran program was still a state secret. The appearance of Volk as a crew member caused some, including the British Interplanetary Society magazine Spaceflight, to ask why a test pilot was occupying a Soyuz seat usually reserved for researchers or foreign cosmonauts.

After his orbital flight, Volk served as the head of pilot-cosmonaut training department for the Buran program and later (after the project's cancellation) worked for the Gromov Flight Research Institute as a Flight Tests Deputy Chief before retiring in 1996. He previously served as President of the National Aero Club of Russia and Vice President of the Fédération Aéronautique Internationale. As recognition for his contributions as a test pilot and cosmonaut he was awarded the Hero of the Soviet Union on 29 July 1984.

== Social work ==
- Member of the City Council of the city of Zhukovsky (1984-1987)
- President of the All-Union Tennis Federation of the USSR (1986-1990)
- President of the Federation of Aviation Fans (since 1988)
- Member of the Executive Committee of the Green Movement (since 1989). An active supporter of the environmental movement in the USSR and Russia.
- First Vice-President of the Federation of Cosmonautics of Russia (FKR), Chairman of the Executive Committee of the FKR (2003-2005)

Since April 1990, Volk has been a member of the editorial board of the Wings of the Motherland magazine. He participated in the transcontinental flight Moscow - Canberra - Moscow on a Yak-18T aircraft (November 12, 1991 - February 2, 1992).

On 21 November 2013, he signed an open letter to the President criticizing the United Aircraft Corporation and its leader Mikhail Pogosyan for curtailing the program for the production of the Tu-334 aircraft. Also, in this letter, the Superjet project is directly criticized.

In May 2016, Volk supported the program of environmentalists in the elections and primaries of United Russia in the Moscow Oblast. He actively supported the environmental projects of the EkoGrad magazine.

== Other accomplishments ==
Volk was an inventor. He also supported a number of startups including a four-person concept flying car, etc.

== Personal life ==
Volk was married and had two children. He died on 3 January 2017 while on holiday in Plovdiv, Bulgaria. He is buried together with his daughter at the Bykovskoye Memorial Cemetery in Zhukovsky.

== Honours and awards ==
- Hero of the Soviet Union
- Pilot-Cosmonaut of the USSR
- Honoured Test Pilot of the USSR
- Zhukovsky Honorary Citizen
- Order "For Merit to the Fatherland" 4th class
- Order of Lenin
- Order of the Red Banner of Labour
- Order of Friendship of Peoples
- Medal "For Merit in Space Exploration"

== Memory ==
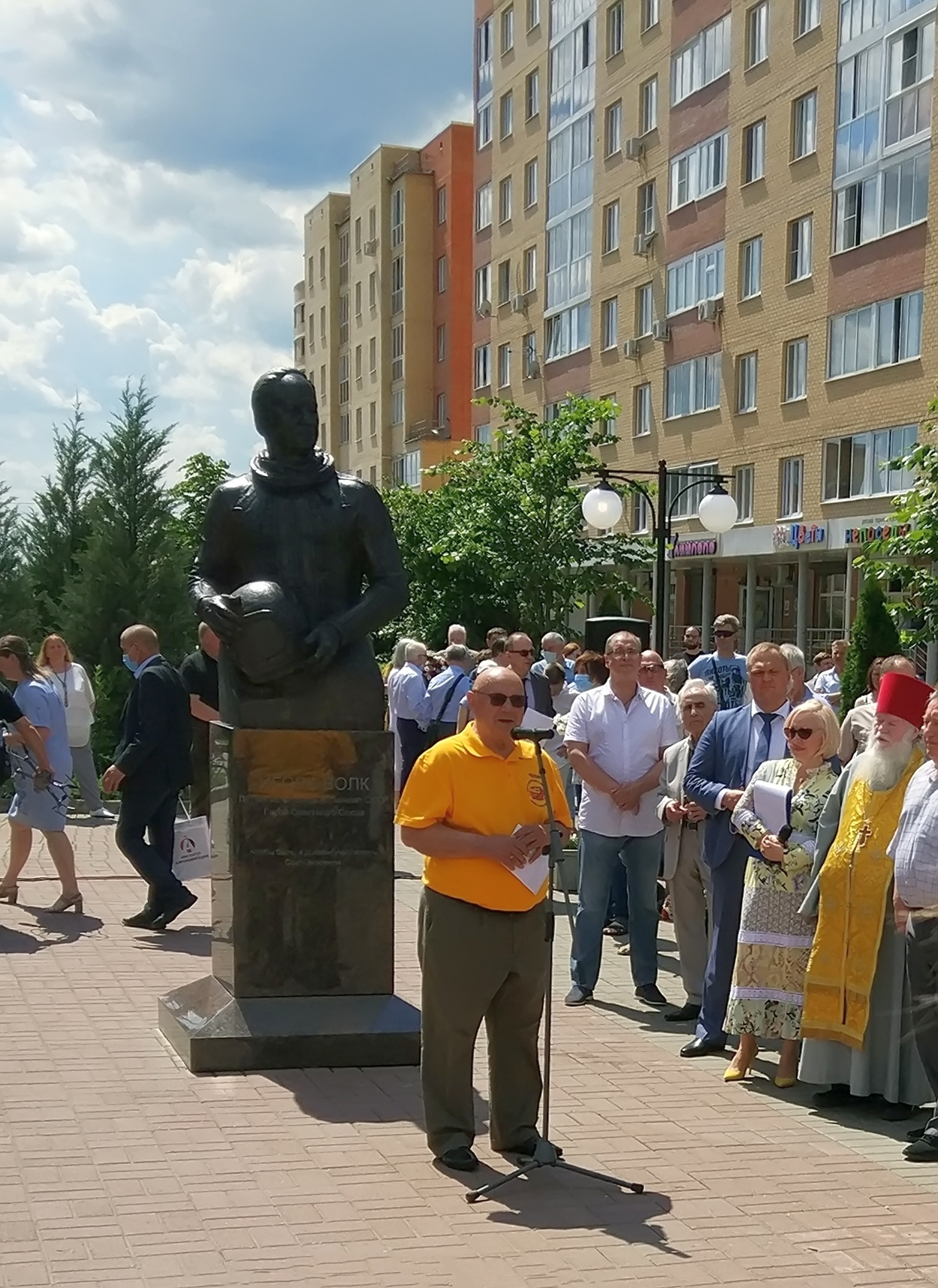
Speech of Vladimir Dzhanibekov at the opening ceremony of Igor Volk memorial bust in Zhukovsky, Moscow Oblast

Bust of Igor Volk is installed at Solnechnaya Street in the city of Zhukovsky.
