= Anatoly Kvochur =

Russian test pilot (1952–2024)

- Анатолий Квочур
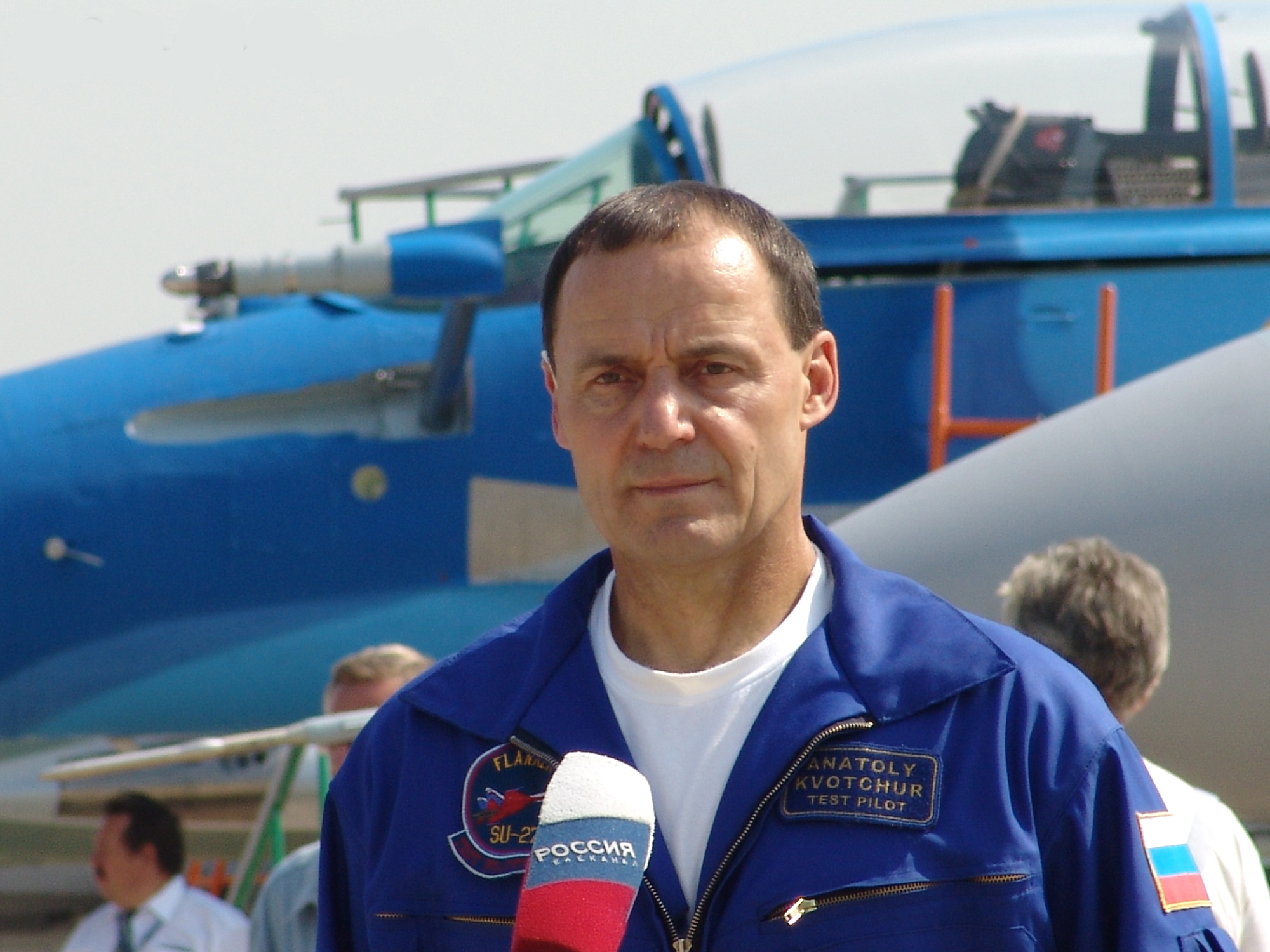
- Kvochur in 2007
- Born: Anatoly Nikolayevich Kvochur; 16 April 1952; Mazurovka, Chernivtsi Raion, Vinnytsia Oblast, Ukrainian SSR, USSR
- Died: 15 April 2024 (aged 71); Zhukovsky, Moscow Oblast, Russia
- Awards: Hero of the Russian Federation (1992)
- Aviation career
- Rank: Air Force Colonel

Signature
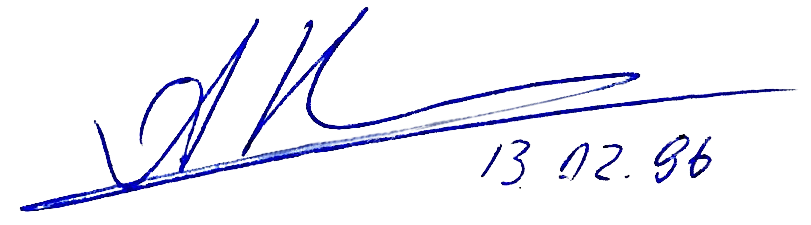

Anatoly Nikolayevich Kvochur (Russian: Анатолий Николаевич Квочур; 16 April 1952 – 15 April 2024) was a Soviet and Russian test pilot. He was awarded the awards Honoured Test Pilot of the USSR (1990) and Hero of the Russian Federation (1992).

== Biography ==
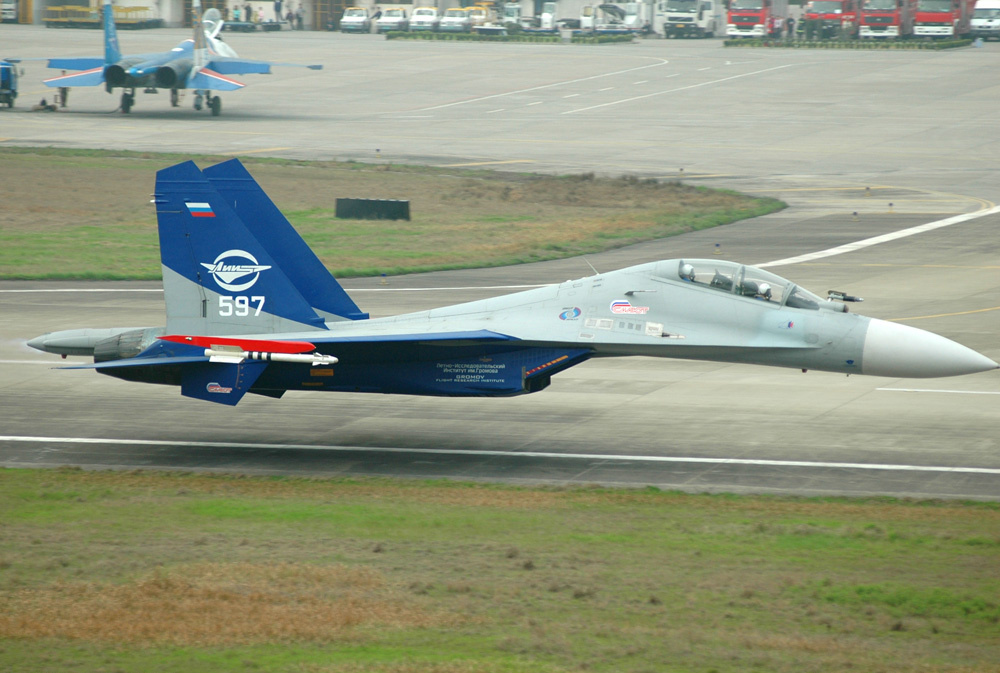
Kvochur piloting a Sukhoi Su-30LL demonstrator along the runway extremely close to the ground at Zhangjiajie Hehua International Airport, March 2006

Anatoly Kvochur was born on 16 April 1952, in the village of Mazurovka, Mohyliv-Podilskyi in the Vinnytsia Oblast of Ukrainian Soviet Socialist Republic.

Kvochur studied at the V. M. Komarov Higher Military Flying School at Yeysk, graduating in 1973. He began service as a pilot in the Group of Soviet Forces in Germany. He served for two years before he was discharged from the Soviet Armed Forces in 1977 with a recommendation for admittance to the Fedotov Test Pilot School. He graduated from the school in 1978.

From 1978 to 1981 he worked as a test pilot at Komsomolsk-on-Amur, testing Su-17 aircraft and its modifications. He studied further at the Moscow Aviation Institute, graduating in 1981.

Kvochur was transferred to the Mikoyan Design Bureau where he participated in the testing of more than 80 types of aircraft, including MiG-21, MiG-23, MiG-27, MiG-29, MiG-31, as well as air-to-air and air-to-surface missiles. He later appeared in numerous international air shows, showcasing Russian aircraft.

In 1995, Kvochur participated in a very long range flight demonstration of Su-27PD and Su-27PU Flankers featuring an inflight refueling probe. He led an aerobatic team, known as the Test Pilots Team (Lyotchiki-Ispyttahteli), which included the pilots Vladimir Loginovsky and Alexander Garnaev. Kvochur died on 15 April 2024, one day before his 72nd birthday. He was buried at the Federal Military Memorial Cemetery on 17 April 2024.

== Paris Air Show incident ==
Kvochur was involved in an air show accident on 8 June 1989 at the Paris Air Show. He was flying a single-seater Mikoyan MiG-29 Fulcrum 'Blue 303', the Soviet Union's latest fighter aircraft. While executing a low-speed, high-angle attack portion of his routine, a bird was sucked into the right engine (a bird strike), causing the turbofan engine to burst into flames.

Kvochur immediately turned the remaining engine to full afterburner. His speed, at 180 kilometres per hour (110 mph), was too slow to maintain stability on one engine, and the aircraft entered a steep dive. Kvochur managed to steer the MiG away from the crowd and ejected 2.5 seconds before impact. He landed 30 metres (98 ft) away from the fireball of the crashed plane.

The incident was caught on video and is featured on the reality television series World's Most Amazing Videos and reused in the pseudo-documentary World War III.

Kvochur's Mig-29 had a Zvezda K-36D ejection seat. The same ejection seat helped save the lives of the pilots of two MiG-29s that collided mid-air at the Royal International Air Tattoo in July 1993, and the pilot and navigator of a Sukhoi Su-30 that crashed from a tail-strike at the Paris Air Show in June 1999, which was also captured on video.

== Awards and recognition ==
- Order of the Red Banner of Labour, 1988.
- Honoured Test Pilot of the USSR, 8 August 1990.
- Hero of the Russian Federation, 17 November 1992.
- Order "For Merit to the Fatherland", 3rd class, 15 January 1998.
