= Aleksandr Fedotov (pilot) =

Soviet Air Force Major General (1932–1984)

Aleksandr Vasilyevich Fedotov
- Born: 23 June 1932; Stalingrad, Soviet Union (now Volgograd, Russia)
- Died: 4 April 1984 (aged 51); Moscow Region, Russia
- Military career
- Allegiance: Soviet Union
- Rank: Major General of Aviation
- Awards: Hero of the Soviet Union; Lenin Prize

Alexander Vasilyevich Fedotov (23 June 1932, Stalingrad, USSR – 4 April 1984, USSR) was a Soviet test pilot who was a Hero of the Soviet Union, Honoured Test Pilot of the USSR, Lenin Prize holder and Major-General of Aviation.

== Biography ==
He was born on 23 June 1932 in the city of Stalingrad (now Volgograd) in the USSR in a family of Russian ethnicity. During the Second World War he and his mother fled from the besieged Stalingrad. The Fedotov family returned to Stalingrad only after its liberation, but without Alexandrov's father, who fought on the front and died in battle during the Warsaw Uprising in 1944. In 1947, at the age of fifteen, he completed seven-year primary school and joined the 7th Specialised School of Air Armed Forces USSR.

== Career ==
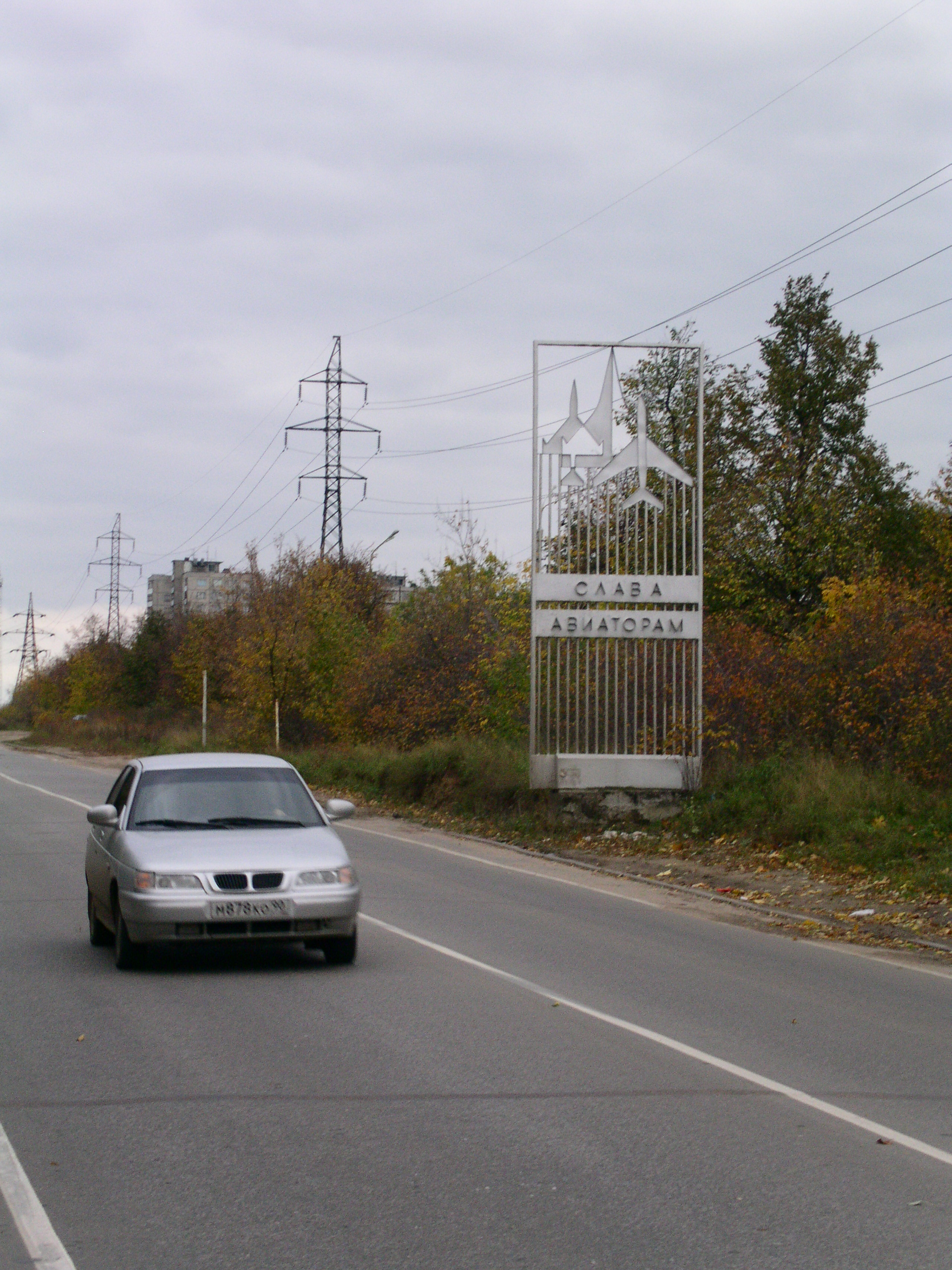
Stela "Glory to Aviators" in Zhukovsky

Fedotov attended the Armavir Military Aviation School of Pilots at Armavir, Krasnodar Krai, Russia, graduating in 1952, and then became a flight instructor.

In 1958 he attended the Ministry of Industrial Aviation Test Pilot School at Zhukovsky. He graduated from the Moscow Aviation Institute in 1965.

From August 1958 to his death in 1984, he was a test pilot of the Mikoyan bureau. Fedotov participated in the tests of the MiG-19, MiG-21, MiG-23, MiG-25, MiG-27, MiG-29, MiG-31 and their modifications. For the first time in the country, he reached a speed corresponding to Mach 3.

On E-166 and MiG-25 aircraft, he set 18 world aviation records (of which three are absolute), speed, dynamic ceiling, load capacity and climbing speed. In particular, he still owns the unaccounted flight altitude record (37,650 metres) for crewed jet aircraft, established on 31 August 1977, in an experimental MiG-25M fighter.

Fedotov lived in the city of Zhukovsky in the Moscow region.

He died on 4 April 1984, during a test flight on the MiG-31, together with the test navigator V.S. Zaitsev. In that flight there was a false alarm indication of the emergency fuel reserve system, and Fedotov decided to land. Believing that there was little fuel on the plane, he made a sharp manoeuver, but the heavy, fuel-filled airplane rolled over and dived into the ground. Neither Fedotov nor Zaitsev survived.

He was buried at the Bykov cemetery of the city of Zhukovsky.

His honors included being awarded Major-General of Aviation (1983), Honored Coach of the USSR (1976), master of sports of international class (1975), Honoured Test Pilot of the USSR (1969), and Hero of the Soviet Union (1966). He was awarded the FAI Gold Air Medal in 1975, and the Lenin Prize in 1981. He was awarded two Orders of Lenin, the Order of the Red Banner, the Red Banner of Labour and medals.

== Memorial ==
- There is a Fedotov Street in the city of Zhukovsky
- The name of Alexandr Fedotov is assigned to the main Russian test pilot school in Zhukovsky
- The name Alexandr Fedotov was awarded to school No. 24 in the Kirov district of the city of Volgograd
- There is a bust of him in Armavir, Russia

== See also ==
- Flight altitude records
