= Honoured Test Pilot of the USSR =

Honorary title Honoured Test Pilot of the USSR
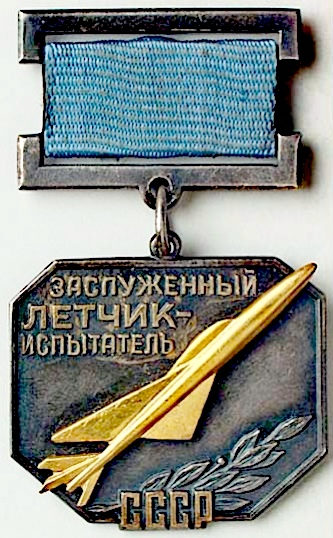
- Obverse of the chest badge "Honoured Test Pilot of the USSR"
- Type: Honorary title
- Awarded for: Excellence in flight research and testing of aircraft
- Presented by: Soviet Union Presidium of the Supreme Soviet
- Eligibility: Citizens of the Soviet Union
- Status: No longer awarded
- Established: August 14, 1958
- First award: February 17, 1959

Precedence
- Equivalent: Honoured Test Navigator of the USSR

The Honorary Title "Honoured Test Pilot of the USSR" (Russian: Заслуженный лётчик-испытатель СССР) was a state award of the Soviet Union established on August 14, 1958, by Decree of the Presidium of the Supreme Soviet No. 2523-X to recognise courage and excellence of military and civilian test pilots in flight research and testing of aircraft. Its statute was confirmed on August 22, 1988, by Decree of the Presidium of the Supreme Soviet No. 9441-XI. The title ceased to be awarded following the December 1991 dissolution of the Soviet Union.

== Award Statute ==
The honorary title "Honoured Test Pilot of the USSR" was awarded to military and civilian test-pilots 1st class of the aerospace and defense industry and the Soviet Armed Forces, for multiple years of creative work in the field of testing and research of new aviation technologies.

The Presidium of the Supreme Soviet of the USSR was the main conferring authority of the award based on recommendations from the Ministry of Defence of the USSR (Russian: Министерство обороны СССР) or from the Ministry of Aviation Industry of the USSR (Russian: Министерство авиационной промышленности СССР).

The "Honoured Military Test Pilot of the USSR" chest badge was worn on the right side of the chest and in the presence of other orders, placed above them. If worn with honorary titles of the Russian Federation, the latter have precedence.

== Award Description ==
The chest badge "Honoured Test Pilot of the USSR" was a 27mm wide by 23mm high silver and nickel polygon with raised edges. At the top of the obverse, the relief inscription in three lines covered to the left "HONOURED TEST PILOT" (Russian: ЗАСЛУЖЕННЫЙ ЛËТЧИК-ИСПЫТАТЕЛЬ), in the center, the gilt tombac image of a jet plane climbing diagonally towards the right its nose and tail slightly protruding over the edges, at the bottom, the relief inscription "USSR" (Russian: СССР) superimposed over a laurel branch.

The badge was secured to a standard Soviet square mount by a silver-plated ring through the suspension loop. The mount was covered by a silk moiré blue ribbon. It was secured to clothing by a threaded stud and nut or by a pin attachment.

== Notable Recipients (partial list) ==
- Yury Abramovich
- Sergei Anokhin
- Toktar Aubakirov
- Yuri Garnaev
- Vladimir Ilyushin
- Rafael Kaprelyan
- Vladimir Kokkinaki
- Anatoly Kvochur
- Nina Rusakova
- Rimantas Stankevičius
- Amet-khan Sultan
- Igor Volk

== See also ==
- Orders, decorations, and medals of the Soviet Union
- Badges and Decorations of the Soviet Union
- Soviet Air Force
