= List of Heroes of the Russian Federation (L) =

This is a list of people who have been awarded the title Hero of the Russian Federation.

It has been awarded more than 970 times, of which more than 440 were posthumously.

== List of Heroes of the Russian Federation ==
- Mikhail Labunets ru
- Larisa Lazutina
- Aleksandr Lazutkin
- Aleksandr Lays ru
- Andrey Lamanov ru
- Mikhail Lantsev ru
- Andrey Laptev ru
- Dmitry Larin ru
- Vladimir Lastochkin ru
- Aleksandr Lebedev ru
- Anatoly Lebed
- Pyotr Lebezhikhin ru
- Sergey Levashov ru
- Valery Legasov
- Vladimir Legoshin ru
- Igor Lelyukh ru
- Ivan Leonov ru
- Sergey Lipovoy ru
- Dmitry Lisitsky ru
- Leonid Lobas ru
- Yuri Lobov ru
- Oleg Lobunets ru
- Vladimir Loginovsky ru
- Yuri Lonchakov
- Saypuddin Lorsanov ru
- Mikhail Lukin ru
- Aleksandr Lutsenko ru
- Sergey Lysyuk ru
- Gennady Lyachin
