= Test pilot =

Pilot with extra training to test aircraft

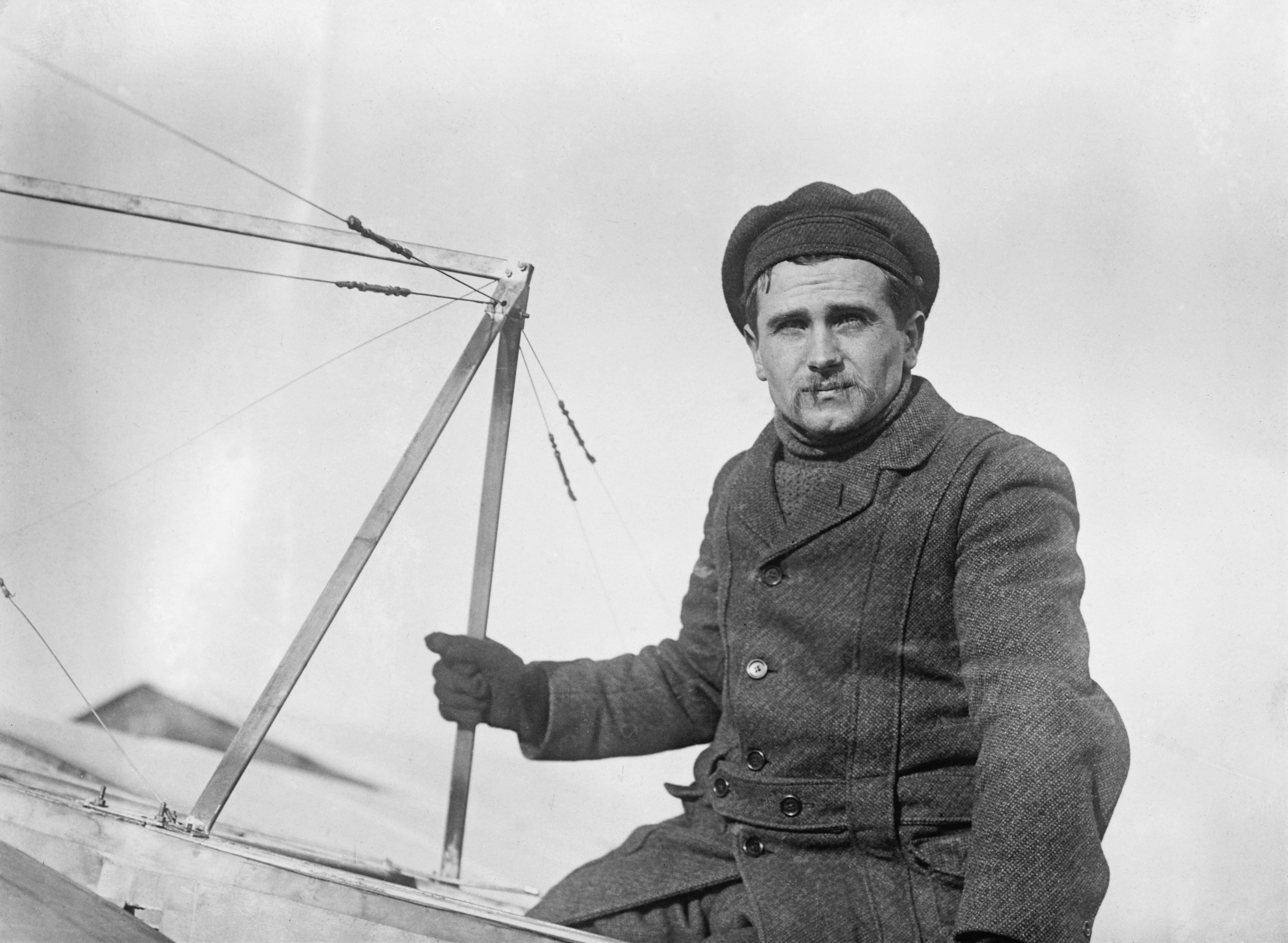
Léon Lemartin, the world's first professional test pilot, by contract to Louis Blériot, August 20, 1910.

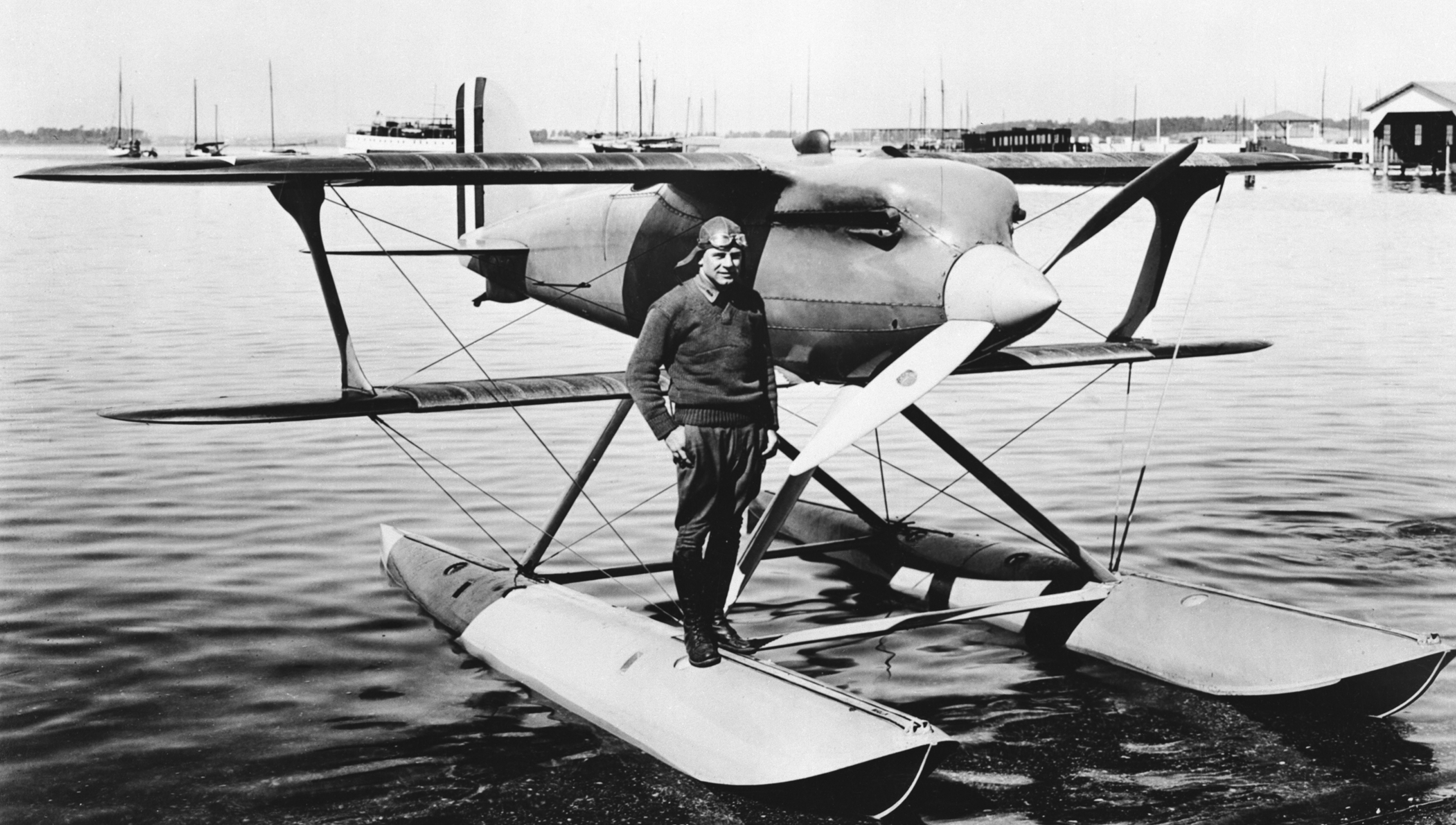
Jimmy Doolittle in 1928 with his Curtiss R3C-2, a year before he pioneered instrument flying

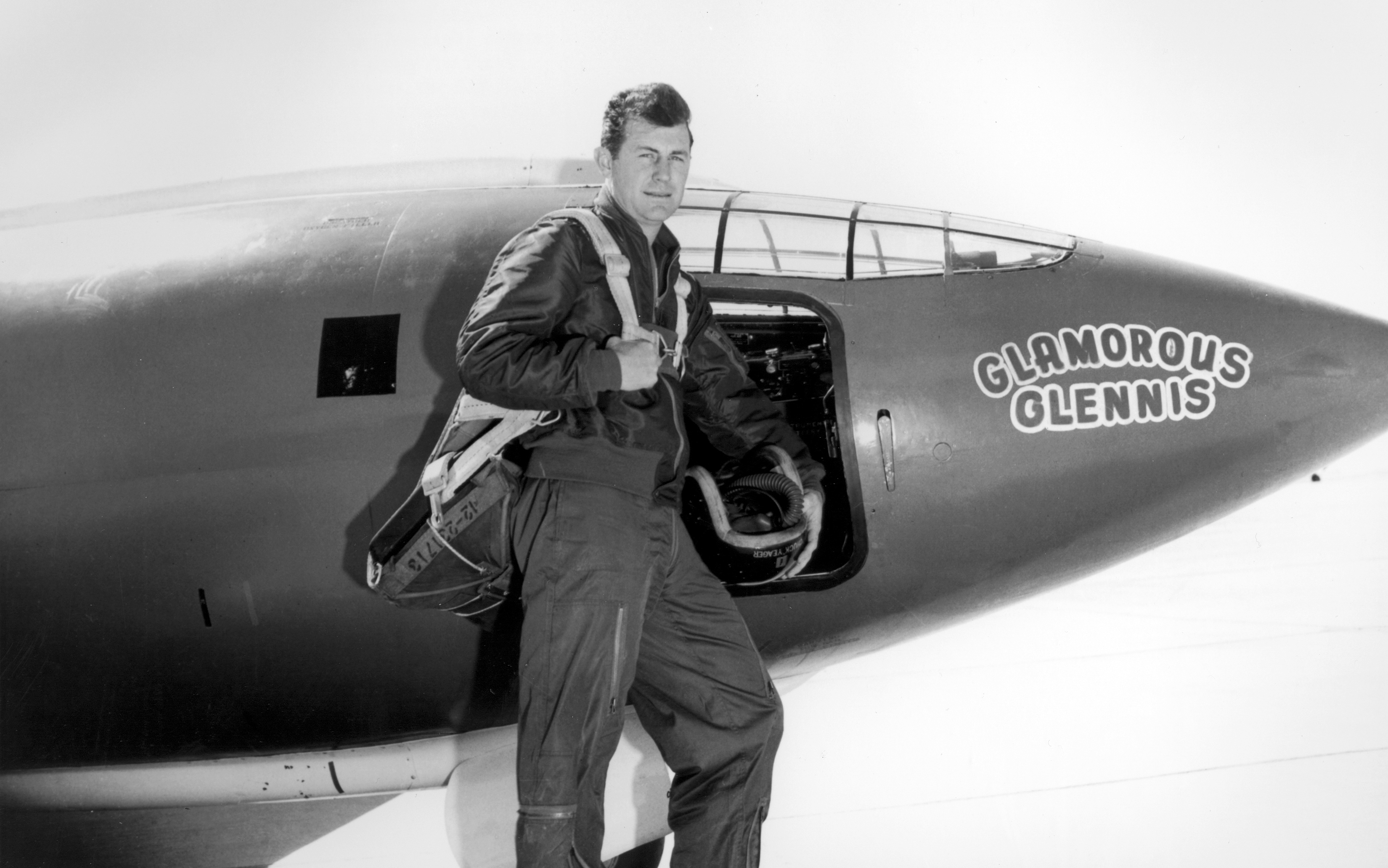
Chuck Yeager and the Bell X-1, first test pilot to break the sound barrier at Mach 1 in 1947

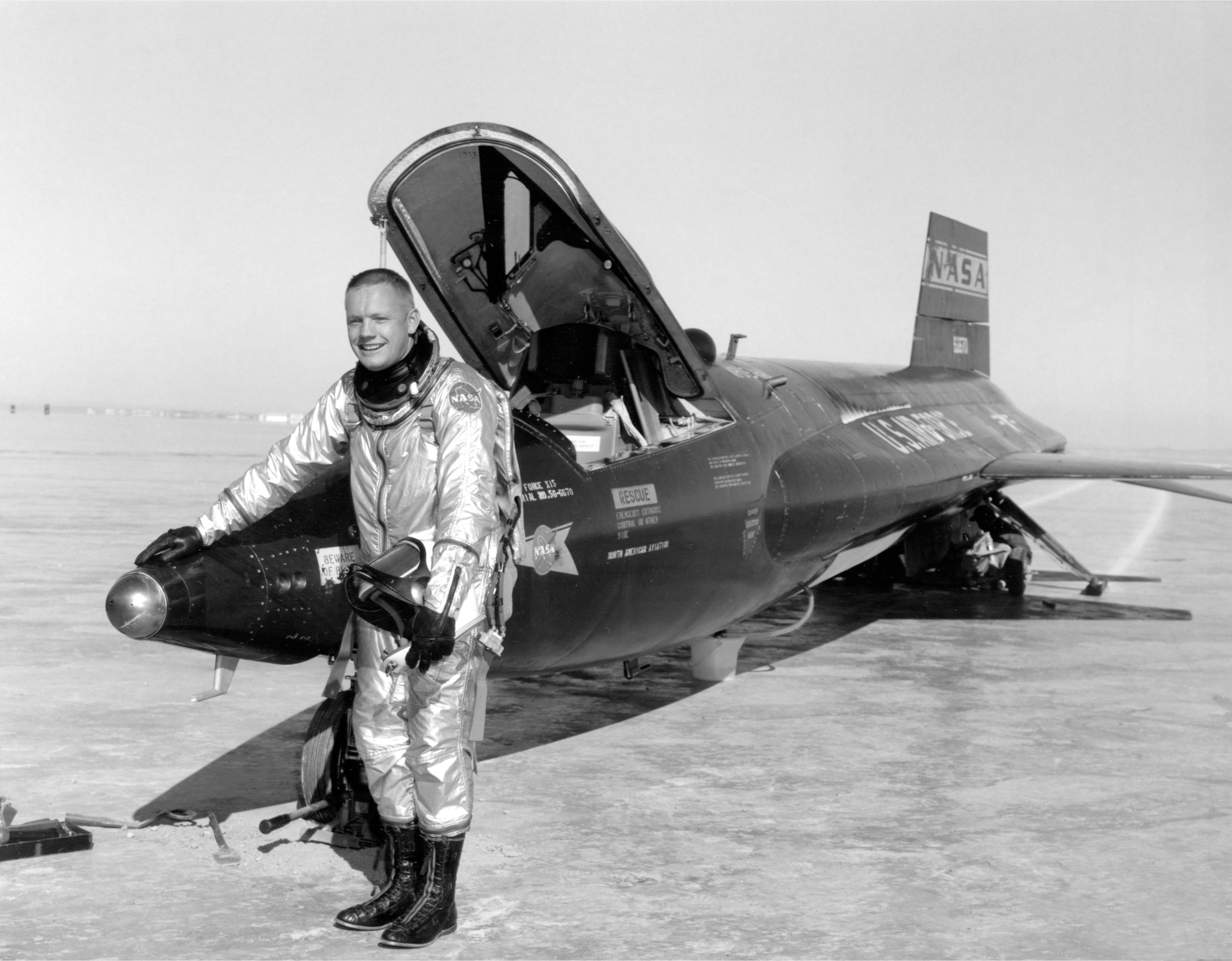
Neil Armstrong and the North American X-15 after a research test flight in 1960

A test pilot is an aircraft pilot with additional training to fly and evaluate experimental, newly produced and modified aircraft with specific maneuvers, known as flight test techniques.

== History ==
Léon Lemartin was the world's first professional test pilot by contract to Louis Blériot on August 20, 1910.

Test flying as a systematic activity started during the First World War, at the Royal Aircraft Establishment (RAE) in the United Kingdom. An "Experimental Flight" was formed at the Central Flying School. During the 1920s, test flying was further developed by the RAE in the UK, and by the National Advisory Committee for Aeronautics (NACA) in the United States. In the 1950s, NACA was transformed into the National Aeronautics and Space Administration, or NASA. During these years, as work was done into aircraft stability and handling qualities, test flying evolved towards a more qualitative scientific profession. Risks involved for pilots have been significantly reduced in modern times because of the maturation of aircraft technology, better ground-testing and simulation of aircraft performance, fly-by-wire technology and, lately, the use of unmanned aerial vehicles to test experimental aircraft features. Still, piloting experimental aircraft remains more dangerous than most other types of flying.

At the insistence of President Dwight D. Eisenhower, the first American astronauts, the Mercury Seven, were all military test pilots, as were some of the later astronauts.

The world's oldest test pilot school is what is now called the Empire Test Pilots' School (motto "Learn to Test – Test to Learn"), at RAF Boscombe Down in the UK. There are a number of similar establishments over the world. In America, the United States Air Force Test Pilot School is located at Edwards Air Force Base, the United States Naval Test Pilot School is located at Naval Air Station Patuxent River, Maryland and EPNER (Ecole du Personnel Navigant d'Essai et de Reception – "School for flight test and acceptance personnel"), the French test pilot school, is located in Istres, France. There are only two civilian schools; the International Test Pilots School in London, Ontario, and the National Test Pilot School, a not-for-profit educational institute is in Mojave, California. In Russia, there is a Russian aviation industry Fedotov Test Pilot School (founded 1947) located in Zhukovsky within the Gromov Flight Research Institute.

== Qualifications ==
Test pilots can be experimental and engineering test pilots (investigating the characteristics of new types of aircraft during development) or production test pilots (the more mundane role of confirming the characteristics of new aircraft as they come off the production line). Many test pilots would perform both roles during their careers. Modern test pilots often receive formal training from highly-selective military test pilot schools, but other test pilots receive training and experience from civilian institutions and/or manufacturers' test pilot development programs (see list of test pilot schools).

== Notable test pilots (partial list) ==
- Fernando Alonso, former Head of Airbus Flight Test
- Milburn Apt, first U.S. Air Force test pilot to fly faster than Mach 3
- Toktar Aubakirov, Soviet test pilot first Kazakh in space
- Eric "Winkle" Brown, flew more aircraft types than any other pilot
- Scott Crossfield, chief test pilot at North American Engineering
- David P. Davies, chief test pilot for the UK Civil Aviation Authority
- Aleksandr Fedotov, first Soviet pilot to reach Mach 3
- Geoffrey de Havilland, first to fly the Mosquito
- Alex Henshaw, WWII British test pilot, air racer and author
- Vladimir Ilyushin, first Soviet pilot to fly the Su-27
- Alvin M. Johnston, aka "Tex", test pilot for Boeing who famously performed a barrel roll in a 707 prototype.
- Anatoly Kvochur, Soviet/Russian test pilot known for aerobatics in Su-27 and MiG-29
- Léon Lemartin, world's first professional test pilot, under contract to Louis Blériot 08/20/1910
- Tony LeVier, chief engineering test pilot at Lockheed Corporation
- Viktor Pugachev, first public performer of the Cobra maneuver
- Steven M. Rainey, commander of 411th Flight Test Squadron and first pilot to fly cross-country in the F-22 Raptor
- Hanna Reitsch, WWII German aviator and test pilot
- Svetlana Savitskaya, Soviet/Russian test pilot, cosmonaut and politician
- 'Mutt' Summers, first to fly the Supermarine Spitfire
- Brian Trubshaw, first British pilot to fly the Concorde
- André Turcat, French test pilot and first to fly the Concorde
- Pavel Vlasov, Soviet/Russian test pilot known for aerobatics in MiG-29OVT
- Igor Volk, Soviet/Russian test pilot and lead cosmonaut in the Buran programme
- Chuck Yeager, first pilot to break the sound barrier in level flight

== See also ==
- List of aerospace flight test centres
- The Right Stuff by Tom Wolfe
