= State Prize of the Russian Federation =

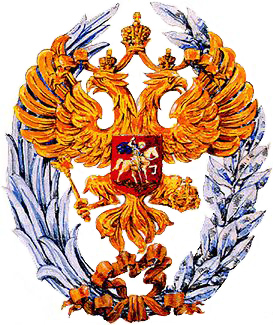
- Awarded for: Outstanding contributions in (1) science and technology; (2) literature and arts; (3) humanitarian work
- Country: Russia
- Presented by: President of Russia
- First award: 1992

The State Prize of the Russian Federation, (Note: Russian: Государственная Премия Российской Федерации, romanized: Gosudarstvennaya Premiya Rossiyskoy Federatsii) officially translated in Russia as Russian Federation National Award, is a state honorary prize established in 1992 following the breakup of the Soviet Union. In 2004 the rules for selection of laureates and the status of the award were significantly changed, making them closer to such awards as the Nobel Prize or the Soviet Lenin Prize.

Every year seven prizes are awarded:

- Three prizes in science and technology (according to newspaper Kommersant there was a fourth 2008 State Prize for Science and Technology awarded by a special decree of President Dmitri Medvedev but the name of the winner is kept secret because of the confidential character of the work);
- Three prizes in literature and the arts;
- One prize for humanitarian work (established in 2005).

Only three prizes for humanitarian work have been awarded so far: to Patriarch Alexius II, Primate of the Russian Orthodox Church (2005), to Russian writer Aleksandr Solzhenitsyn (2006) and to French President Jacques Chirac (2007).

The award consists of a cash prize amounting to 5 million Russian rubles (approximately $200,000), a medal and a certificate. If a number of coauthors equally contributed to a prize-winning work the prize is divided among no more than three authors.

The prize is presented by the President of Russia in a ceremony held in Grand Kremlin Palace at the Moscow Kremlin, on 12 June, Russia Day, which is broadcast by the major channels in the country.

== Medal ==
The medal for the State Prize was developed by the artist Yevgeny Ukhnalyov (Евгений Ухналёв). The design is based on the coat of arms of Russia. It shows a gold double-headed eagle holding a scepter and a globus cruciger with a red shield depicting St. George and the Dragon. The eagle is crowned by two small and one large crown and put on a silver wreath consisted of palm and laurel branches joined by a red ribbon. The design was adopted in 2005.

== Selected laureates ==
Complete listings are available on Russian Wikipedia; for example: Laureates of the State Prize of the Russian Federation for 1992, over 60 names of recipients.

=== 1992 ===
Literature and the arts

- Sofia Gubaidulina, for Offertorium
- Rodion Shchedrin, for The Sealed Angel

=== 1993 ===
Literature and the arts

- Fazil Iskander
- Oleg Chukhontsev

=== 1994 (for 1993) ===
- Vladislav Kirpichev
- Aleksandr Petrov

=== 1995 (for 1994) ===
Literature and the arts

- Mikhail Gasparov
- Lyudmila Maksakova

Science and technology

- Svyatoslav Gabuda
- Aleksandr Starovoitov

=== 1996 ===
Literature and the arts

- Slava Zaitsev
- Inna Churikova

=== 1997 (for 1996) ===
Science and technology

- Valentin Panteleimonovich Smirnov

Literature and arts

- Sergey Bezrukov
- Boris Nemensky

=== 1998 ===
- Oleg Anikanov
- Inna Lisnyanskaya
- Alexandr Revich

=== 1999 ===
- Fyodor Bunkin, Vitaly Konov, Vadim Fedorov, Nikolay Generalov, Gennady Kozlov, Yuri Raizer, for discovering of laser burning and continuous optical discharge
- Anatoly Savin
- Mailen Konstantinovsky (for 1998), for radio series "KOAPP"
- Georgy Isahakyan, theatre director

=== 2001 (for 2000) ===
Literature and the arts

- Andrey Logvin
- Vladimir Voinovich, for Monumental Propaganda
- Andrey Volos, for Hurramabad
- Polina Agureeva

Science and technology

- Vladimir_Kashin, for "Scientific Foundations of Vegetative Propagation of Plants by the Method of Green Cuttings"

=== 2002 (for 2001) ===
Literature and the arts

- Yelena Panova, for her role in Border. Taiga Romance

Science and technology

- Zhores I. Alferov, Levon V. Asryan, Dieter Bimberg, Petr S. Kop'ev, Nikolay N. Ledentsov, Robert A. Suris, Victor M. Ustinov, Vitaly A. Shchukin, for "fundamental investigations of heterostructures with quantum dots and developing quantum dot lasers"

=== 2003 (for 2002) ===
Literature and the arts

- Vatslav Mikhalsky, for his novel The Spring in Carthage
- Vladislav Kazenin

Science and technology

- Alexander Sergeevitch Gasparov, for development and practical implementation of endoscopic methods in gynecology
- Viktor Sadovnichiy
- Evgeny Velikhov

=== 2004 (for 2003) ===
Science and technology

- Alexei Fridman, V. Afanasiev, S. Dodonov, Anatolii Zasov, Valerij Polyachenko, Olga Silchenko, Evgenii Snezhkin, Oleg Khoruzhii, for prediction and discovery of new structures in spiral galaxies

=== 2005 (for 2004) ===
Science and technology

- Alexander Kvasnikov, Valery Kolinko, Arkady Vershkin, creation of optics-electronic complex for control of the outer space
- Vyacheslav Molodin and Natalia Polosmak, for discovering of the Pazyryk culture
- Ludvig Faddeev, for development of mathematical physics

Literature and the arts

- Bella Akhmadulina, for poetry
- Leonid Krasnochyev and Ninel Kuzmina, for restoration of the Assumption Church in Veliky Novgorod
- Anna Netrebko, for her opera works

=== 2006 (for 2005) ===
Humanitarian work

- Patriarch Alexius II, for his enlightening and peacemaking activities

Science and technology

- Igor Gorynin, for development of new construction materials
- Alexander Skrinsky, director of the Budker Institute of Nuclear Physics, for development in high energy physics

Literature and the arts

- Aleksey Batalov, for cinema works
- Nurlan Khanetov, Leonid Lyubavsky, Renat Kharis, for developing of national epic traditions
- Mikhail Pletnyov, for his performances and innovations in music culture

=== 2007 (for 2006) ===
Humanitarian work

- Aleksandr Solzhenitsyn, for his humanitarian work

Science and technology

- Yury Vasiliyevich Gulyayev and Vladislav Pustovoyt, for developments in acousto-electronics and acousto-optics
- Sergey Nikitich Kovalyov and Igor Spassky (both from the Rubin Design Bureau), David Pashayev, for development of Nuclear submarines
- Alexander Nikolayevich Konovalov, director of Burdenko Central neurosurgical institute, for new methods neurosurgery

Literature and the arts

- Nikolay Borodacheyov, Irina Vasina, Vladimir Dmitriev from Gosfilmofond
- Olga Borodina, for her contributions to the world musical art
- Svetlana Zakharova, for her ballet works

=== 2008 (for 2007) ===
According to the newspaper Kommersant there was a fourth State Prize for Science and Technology awarded by a special decree of President Dmitri Medvedev but the name of the winner is kept secret because of the confidential character of the work.

==== Science and technology ====
- Vladimir Arnold, Russian mathematician
- Andrey Zaliznyak, Russian linguist
- Alexey Khokhlov, polymer scientist

==== Literature and arts ====
- Vladimir Petrovich Gritsenko and Andrey Nikolayevich Naumov, researchers from the Museum of Battle of Kulikovo

Vladimir Danilov

- Andrey Kovalchuk, Russian sculptor
- Alisa Freindlich, actress of the Tovstonogov Theater in Saint Petersburg

==== Humanitarian activity ====
- Jacques Chirac

=== 2009 (for 2008) ===
==== Science and technology ====
- Yevgeny Kaspersky, anti-virus software inventor
- Iosif Atabekov
- Dmitry Varshalovich
- Anatoly Cherepaschuk
- Alexei Fridman

==== Literature and arts ====
- Dmitry Liss
- Alexandr Koloturitsky
- Anatoly Prokhorov
- Ilya Popov
- Salavat Shaikhanurov

==== Humanitarian assistance ====
- Valentina Tereshkova

=== 2010 (for 2009) ===
==== Science and technology ====
- Nikolay Vinokurov
- Vladislav Panchenko
- Aleksandr Aleksandrovich Potapov
- Valery Chissov
- Valentin Parmon

==== Literature and arts ====
- Sergey Dzevanovsky
- Yevgeny Yevtushenko
- Denis Matsuev

=== 2011 (for 2010) ===
==== Science and technology ====
- Yuri Oganessian and Mikhail Itkis, for the opening of the new field of stability of superheavy elements
- Artyom Kobzev, Anatoly Evgenevich Lukyanov and Mikhail Titarenko, for outstanding achievements in the development of domestic and world Sinology and the preparation of the fundamental academic encyclopedia The Spiritual Culture of China
- Valentin Gapontsev, for a complex of innovative developments and the creation of a high-tech production of fiber lasers and fiber-optic trunk and local communication systems

==== Literature and arts ====
- Vladimir Malyshev, for his contribution to the preservation and popularization of cultural heritage, the development of traditions and the modernization of national cinema education
- Mikhail Guryev, Molotkov, Valentin Alekseevich and Inatullin, Oleg Zagitovich, for outstanding contribution to the preservation and restoration of unique museum watches and musical mechanisms, the revival of the traditions of Russian masters
- Yevgeny Mironov, for his contribution to the development of domestic theater and cinema

==== Humanitarian activity ====
- Juan Carlos I of Spain

=== 2012 (for 2011) ===
==== Science and technology ====
- Felix Mitrofanov, for scientific study and discovery of large deposits of platinum-palladium ore in the Kola Peninsula
- Rem Petrov and Rahim Khaitov, for outstanding achievements in scientific and practical development of the domestic immunology
- Boris Trofimov, Valery Charushin and Oleg Chupakhin, for a major contribution to the development of organic synthesis, the development of innovative technologies for the production of medicines and materials, including special purposes
- Sergey Fedotovich Boyev, Sergey Dmitrievich Saprykin and Valery Ivanovich Karasev, for the development and creation of high-readiness radar stations of the missile attack warning system

==== Literature and arts ====
- For contribution to the popularization of the achievements of culture and science, outstanding educational activities:
  - Oleg Dobrodeev
  - Sergey Shumakov
  - Svyatoslav Belza
- For contribution to the revival and development of traditional cultural and historical values:
  - Oleg Zharov
  - Yelena Ankudinova
  - Nikolay Aleksandrovich Mukhin
- Galina Malanicheva, for her contribution to the preservation of the national cultural heritage

==== Humanitarian activities ====
- Vladimir Spivakov

=== 2013 (for 2012) ===
==== Science and technology ====
- For outstanding discoveries and works in the field of ancient history in Eurasia and the formation of anatomically modern humans
  - Anatoly Derevyanko
- For a cycle of fundamental work in the field of studying biological diversity, its conservation and environmental safety:
  - Gleb Dobrovolsky
  - Dmitry Pavlov (biologist)
  - Andrey Adrianov
- For the creation of a new class of highly radiation-resistant materials for nuclear reactor vessels and methods for extending their service life:
  - Georgy Kazarov
  - Yaroslav Shtrombakh
  - Alexey Dub
- For the creation of the Yars strategic missile system:
  - Yefim Mezhiritsky
  - Sergey Nikulin
  - Aleksandr Shurygin

==== Literature and arts ====
- Sergey Miroshnichenko, for his contribution to the development of domestic documentary films
- Tahir Salahov, for his contribution to the development of fine art
- Karen Shakhnazarov, for his contribution to the development of Russian cinema, the revival and development of the Mosfilm film studio

==== Humanitarian activity ====
- Valentin Rasputin

=== 2014 (for 2013) ===
==== Science and technology ====
- Anatoly Grigoriev
- Viktor Maslov, for his outstanding contribution to the development of mathematics and the development of the mathematical foundations of modern thermodynamics
- Aleksandr Chubaryan, for the fundamental results of research on the history of relations between Russia and Europe of the 19th and 20th centuries, as well as for his major contribution to the development of new conceptual approaches to teaching history in secondary and higher education

==== Literature and arts ====
- Yuri Bashmet, for contribution to the development of domestic and world culture
- Fazil Iskander, for contribution to the development of domestic literature
- For the creation of the feature film Legend No. 17:
  - Leonid Vereschagin
  - Anton Zlatopolsky
  - Nikolai Lebedev

==== Humanitarian activity ====
- Yevgeny Primakov

=== 2015 (for 2014) ===
==== Science and technology ====
- Yevgeni Kablov
- Gennady Krasnikov
- Valery Tishkov

==== Literature and arts ====
- Tamara Melnikova
- Alexander Sokurov
- Chulpan Khamatova

==== Humanitarian activity ====
- Aleksandra Pakhmutova

=== 2016 (for 2015) ===
==== Science and technology ====
- Eric M. Galimov, for the development of the scientific direction “geochemistry of carbon isotopes”, the theory of diamond formation, for research in the field of oil and gas geology and biogeochemical processes
- Sergey Lukyanov and Eugene D. Sverdlov, for the development and implementation of a set of technologies for analyzing the structure and functions of complex genomes
- Sergey Lukyanov, for a cycle of fundamental and applied work on the study of molecular mediators of immunity, including work on the creation of unique biomedical models

==== Literature and arts ====
- Lev Dodin, for his contribution to the development of domestic and world theater art
- Viktor Zakharchenko, Director General of the Kuban Cossack Choir, for his contribution to the preservation of traditions and the development of domestic musical art
- Sergei Ursuliak, for his contribution to the development of domestic cinema

==== Humanitarian activity ====
- Valery Gergiev

=== 2017 (for 2016) ===
==== Science and technology ====
- Vladimir Bogdanov, Yuriy Baturin and Anatoly Nuryayev, for the creation of rational systems for the development of gas and oil fields in Western Siberia
- Amiran Revishvili, Alexandr Karaskov, and Evgeny Pokushalov, for the scientific substantiation and introduction into clinical practice of a new concept for reducing morbidity and mortality among patients with cardiac arrhythmias
- Nikolai Shakura, and Rashid Sunyaev, for the creation of the theory of disk accretion of matter into black holes

==== Literature and arts ====
- Eduard Artemyev, for his contribution to the development of domestic and world musical art
- Yury Grigorovich, for his outstanding contribution to the development of domestic and world choreographic art
- Mikhail Piotrovsky, for his contribution to the preservation of domestic and world cultural heritage

==== Humanitarian activity ====
- Daniil Granin

=== 2018 (for 2017) ===
==== Science and technology ====
- Mikhail Alfimov, Sergey Gromov and Aleksandr Chibisov, for the development of photoactive supramolecular devices and machines
- Ivan Dedov, for a cycle of work on fundamental endocrinology and the introduction of an innovative model of personalized medicine in health
- Yevgeni Rogayev, for the discovery of genes and molecular genetic mechanisms responsible for human hereditary diseases

==== Literature and arts ====
- Svetlana Sikova, for her contribution to the study, preservation and promotion of marine heritage
- Yuri Temirkanov, for outstanding contribution to the development of domestic and world musical culture
- Boris Eifman, for his contribution to the development of domestic and world choreographic art

==== Humanitarian activity ====
- Irina Antonova

=== 2019 (for 2018) ===
==== Science and technology ====
- Valery Mitrofanov, Vladislav Pustovoyt and Yefim Khazanov, for creating the fundamental foundations and instrumental solutions to problems of registration of gravitational waves
- Vladimir Porkhanov, Vladimir Parshin and Vladimir Kharchenko, for the scientific substantiation and introduction into clinical practice of a new concept for reducing morbidity and mortality in patients with stenotic diseases of the trachea
- Vitaly Naumkin, for his outstanding contribution to oriental studies (Arabic studies and Islamic studies)

==== Literature and arts ====
- Pavel Basinsky
- Nikolai Lugansky
- Yelena Shatkovskaya

==== Humanitarian activity ====
- Rodion Shchedrin

=== 2020 (for 2019) ===
The winners of the State Prize of the Russian Federation for 2019 were named by decrees of the President of the Russian Federation and announced on June 18, 2020. The ceremony took place on June 24, 2020 in the Catherine Hall of the Senate Palace in the Moscow Kremlin.

==== Science and technology ====
- Dmitry Morozov, Director General of Biocad
- Tatyana Chernovskaya, Director of the Department of Biochemistry of Biocad
- Andrei Ulitin, Acting Researcher at the Institute of Biological Instrument Engineering with Experimental Production of the Russian Academy of Sciences
- Dmitry Markovich, academician
- Mikhail Predtechensky, academician
- Vladimir Meledin, doctor of technical sciences
- Andrei Golovnev, director of the Peter the Great Museum of Anthropology and Ethnography

==== Literature and arts ====
- Alexander Ermakov, Director of the Museum-Estate S.V. Rakhmaninov "Ivanovka"
- Valentin Kurbatov, writer and literary critic
- Galina Medvedeva

==== Humanitarian activity ====
- David Tukhmanov, composer

Valery Vechorko, head doctor of the Filatov Valery Vechorko City Clinical Hospital No. 15

=== 2021 (for 2020) ===
==== Science and technology ====
- Eugene Alexandrov, head of the laboratory of the A.F. Ioffe Physico-Technical Institute and Valery Zapassky, leading researcher in I. N. Uraltsev Research Laboratory of Spin Optics
- Alexander Gintsburg, Sergey Borisevich and Denis Logunov, for the development and implementation of effective recombinant vaccines against Ebola and COVID-19 into domestic health care practice

==== Literature and arts ====
- Hilarion (Alfeyev), metropolitan of Volokolamsk (Russian Orthodox Church)
- Hibla Gerzmava, opera singer
- Aleksandr Rukavishnikov, sculptor

=== 2022 (for 2021) ===
==== Science and technology ====
- For experimental and theoretical work on medical proteomics
  - Aleksandr Archakov
  - Andrei Lisitsa
- For the development of preventive and clinical methods aimed at preventing diseases, reducing mortality and increasing the life expectancy of citizens
  - David Zaridze
  - Alexander Rumyantsev
  - Ivan Stilidi
- For outstanding achievements in the creation of unique high-rise buildings and structures, significant contribution to the development of construction sciences and technologies
  - Vladimir Travush,

.

==== Literature and arts ====
- For educational activities to return, preserve and popularize the heritage of Russian emigration:
  - Viktor Moskvin, Director of the State Budgetary Cultural Institution of the City of Moscow "Alexander Solzhenitsyn House of Russian Abroad".
- For contribution to the development of Russian and world fine arts
  - Pavel Nikonov, artist.
- For contribution to the study, preservation and popularization of the historical and cultural heritage of Russia:
  - Gulzada Rudenko, General Director of the State Budgetary Cultural Institution of the Republic of Tatarstan "Elabuga State Historical, Architectural and Art Museum-Reserve".

==== Humanitarian activity ====
- Margarita Urmancheyeva and Yelizaveta Oleshkina.

=== 2023 (for 2022) ===
In accordance with a presidential decree, the following received the prize for the year 2022: and announced 9 June 2023.

==== Science and technology ====
- For scientific substantiation and implementation into clinical practice of the concept of minimally invasive surgical treatment of oncological diseases of the abdominal cavity and retroperitoneal space:
  - Dmitry Pushkar, Academician of the Russian Academy of Sciences, Head of the Department of Urology of the Federal State Budgetary Educational Institution of Higher Education "Moscow State Medical and Dental University named after A. I. Evdokimov" of the Ministry of Health of the Russian Federation.
  - Khatkov, Igor Evgenievich, academician of the Russian Academy of Sciences, director of the state budgetary healthcare institution of the city of Moscow "Moscow Clinical Scientific and Practical Center named after A. S. Loginov of the Moscow Health Department".
  - Shabunin, Alexey Vasilievich, academician of the Russian Academy of Sciences, chief physician of the state budgetary healthcare institution of the city of Moscow City Clinical Hospital named after S. P. Botkin of the Moscow Health Department.
- For a series of fundamental and applied scientific works that made an outstanding contribution to the development of domestic research on reactor antineutrinos and created the scientific and technical basis for their practical application in the nuclear industry:
  - Mikhail Skorohvatov, Doctor of Physical and Mathematical Sciences, Head of the Department of Neutrino Physics of the Federal State Budgetary Institution "National Research Center "Kurchatov Institute"
  - Vladimir Kopeikin, Doctor of Physical and Mathematical Sciences, leading researcher at the same institution
- For a series of fundamental and applied works on the development and implementation of personalized methods of diagnosis, prevention and therapy into the practice of perinatology, oncology and reproductive medicine:
  - Gennady Sukhikh, academician of the Russian Academy of Sciences, acting director of the federal state budgetary institution "National Medical Research Center for Obstetrics, Gynaecology and Perinatology named after Academician V. I. Kulakov" of the Ministry of Health of the Russian Federation,
  - Levon Ashrafyan, Academician of the Russian Academy of Sciences, Director of the Institute of Oncogynecology and Mammology of the same institution
  - Dmitry Trofimov, corresponding member of the Russian Academy of Sciences, director of the Institute of Reproductive Genetics of the same institution

==== Literature and arts ====
- for many years of fundamental work on the restoration of Ilya Repin’s painting Ivan the Terrible and His Son Ivan:
  - Andrey Golubeiko, restorer
  - Alexandra Orlovskaya, restorer
- For her contribution to the preservation and development of folk art traditions:
  - Alexandra Permyakova, artistic director of the federal state budgetary cultural institution “State Academic Russian Folk Choir named after M. E. Pyatnitsky”
- for the creation of the feature film Challenge:
  - Konstantin Ernst, co-author of the idea, producer
  - Klim Shipenko, director, cameraman
  - Yulia Peresild, leading role

==== Humanitarian activity ====
- Karen Shakhnazarov - General Director of the Federal State Unitary Enterprise "Mosfilm Cinema Concern"

==== Human right activities ====
- Olga Demicheva, President of the International charitable public organization “Fair Aid of Doctor Lisa”

==== Charitable activities ====
- Yulia Zimova, Deputy Chairman of the Commission of the Public Chamber of the Russian Federation on demography, protection of family, children and traditional family values

=== 2024 (for 2023) ===
The winners of the State Prize of the Russian Federation for 2023 were named by decree of the President of Russia on June 11, 2024. The decrees were signed on June 11, 2024. The award ceremony took place on June 12, 2024.

==== Science ====
- For the development, scientific substantiation and implementation in the practice of domestic healthcare of original technologies for transplantation of vital organs:
  - Sergey Gauthier- Academician of the Russian Academy of Sciences, Director of the Federal State Budgetary Institution "National Medical Research Center for Transplantology and Artificial Organs named after Academician V. I. Shumakov" of the Ministry of Health of the Russian Federation"
  - Marina Minina - Doctor of Medical Sciences, Head of the Moscow City Coordination Center for Organ Donation of the State Budgetary Healthcare Institution of the City of Moscow, the S. P. Botkin City Clinical Hospital of the Moscow Department of Health;
  - Mogeli Khubutia - Academician of the Russian Academy of Sciences, President of the "Sklifosovsky Research Institute of Emergency Care of the Moscow Department of Health".
- For a series of fundamental and applied research, development and experimental technological works that have made an outstanding contribution to the development of scientific and technical foundations, substantiation and implementation of the strategy for the two-component development of nuclear energy in the Russian Federation:
  - Mikhail Kovalchuk - Corresponding Member of the Russian Academy of Sciences, President of the Kurchatov Institute
  - Yevgeny Adamov - Doctor of Technical Sciences, Scientific Director of the Joint-Stock Company "Order of Lenin Research and Design Institute of Power Engineering named after N.A. Dollezhal"
  - Vladimir Asmolov - Doctor of Technical Sciences, Advisor to the General Director of the State Atomic Energy Corporation "Rosatom".
- For a series of fundamental and applied works on the study of the functions of the gene of the main tumor suppressor p53 in health and pathology:
  - Pyotr Chumakov- Corresponding Member of the Russian Academy of Sciences, Chief Researcher of the Engelhardt Institute of Molecular Biology of the Russian Academy of Sciences.

==== Literature and arts ====
- For contribution to the development of domestic and world musical art:
  - Ildar Abdrazakov - singer
- For the creation of monuments and memorials dedicated to significant events in Russian history:
  - Andrei Korobtsov — sculptor
  - Konstantin Fomin — sculptor
- For contribution to the revival of the Tsarskoye Selo palace and park ensemble:
  - Olga Taratynova - Director of the State Artistic and Architectural Palace and Park Museum-Reserve "Tsarskoye Selo"
  - Boris Igdalov - Director of the Limited Liability Company "Tsarskoye Selo Amber Workshop"

==== Human rights activities ====
Yulia Belekhova - head of the autonomous non-profit organization "Committee of Families of Warriors of the Fatherland".

==== Charity ====
- Nikolai Slabzhanin - executive director of the interregional charitable public organization Russian Committee "Children's Villages - SOS".

=== 2025 (for 2024) ===
The list was published in a presidential decree issued on 10th of June 2025

==== Science ====
State Prizes in Science and Technology 2024 were awarded to:

- Nikolay V. Kuznetsov, Head of Department, Federal State Budgetary Educational Institution of Higher Education "Saint Petersburg State University", Doctor of Physical and Mathematical Sciences for creating and developing a new scientific field - the theory of hidden oscillations;
- Nikolai Makarov, Director, Federal State Budgetary Scientific Institution "Institute of Archaeology of the Russian Academy of Sciences, Doctor of Historical Sciences, Academician of the Russian Academy of Sciences";
- Maksim Nikitin, Leading Researcher, Head of Laboratory, Federal State Autonomous Educational Institution of Higher Education Moscow Institute of Physics and Technology, Doctor of Physical and Mathematical Sciences.

==== Literature and arts ====
- Yuri Polyakov, writer, playwright;
- Tamara Purtova, director of the federal state budgetary institution of culture Polenov State Russian House of Folk Art;
- Alexey Shalashov, general director of the federal state budgetary institution of culture "Moscow State Academic Philharmonic";
- Aleksandr Chaikovski, composer, artistic director of the federal state budgetary institution of culture "Moscow State Academic Philharmonic".

==== Humanitarian activities ====
- Aleksandr Chubaryan, scientific director of the Institute of General History of the Russian Academy of Sciences, Doctor of Historical Sciences, academician of the Russian Academy of Sciences.

==== Human rights activities ====
- Natalya Karpovich, head of the regional public organization Association of Large Families of the City of Moscow.

==== Charitable activities ====
- Georgy Evgenievich Stolyarenko, general director of the limited liability company "Center for Diagnostics and Surgery of the Posterior Segment of the Eye".

=== 2026 (for 2025) ===
==== Science ====
For the development and implementation of innovative surgical methods for diseases of the central nervous system:

- Vladimir Krylov, Director, Institute of Functional Neurosurgery, Russian Center for Neurology and Neurosciences;

Usachev, Dmitry Yuryevich, Director, N.N. Burdenko National Medical Research Center of Neurosurgery, Ministry of Health of the Russian Federation;

- Konovalov, Nikolai Aleksandrovich, Deputy Director, N.N. Burdenko National Medical Research Center of Neurosurgery, Ministry of Health of the Russian Federation;

For the creation of a domestic complex for hydraulic fracturing of oil and gas reservoirs:

- Zhdaneev, Oleg Valerievich, Doctor of Technical Sciences, Senior Advisor, JSC Foreign Economic Association Promsyrieimport;
- Kovshov, Igor Viktorovich, Candidate of Technical Sciences, Chief Designer of the Scientific and Technical Department, JSC Federal Research and Production Center Titan-Barrikady;
- Korsa-Vavilova, Elena Viktorovna, Candidate of Technical Sciences, Head of Department, JSC Moscow Institute of Thermal Engineering Corporation.

For outstanding achievements in the field of Oriental studies, the history of Arab countries, and international relations in the Middle East:

- Vasiliev, Alexey Mikhailovich, Doctor of Historical Sciences, Academician of the Russian Academy of Sciences, Honorary President of the Institute for African Studies of the Russian Academy of Sciences.

==== Literature ====
For his contribution to the development of Russian and world culture:

- Konchalovsky, Andron Sergeevich, director

For his long-term work promoting historical heritage:

- Ushakova, Marina Viktorovna, chief producer of special serial projects, Federal State Unitary Enterprise VGTRK "GTK TV Channel Rossiya";
- Zhukova, Ekaterina Vladimirovna, producer, Moskino Film Studio LLC.

==== Humanitarian activity ====
- Viktor Sadovnichiy, rector of Moscow State University

==== Charitable activities ====
Zarov, Aleksey Yuryevich - Director and Chief Physician of the ANO "Central Clinical Hospital of St. Alexy, Metropolitan of Moscow"

==== Human rights activities ====
- Tatyana Moskalkova,
