= Nikolai Makarov (archaeologist) =

Soviet and Russian archaeologist and historian

- Николай Макаров
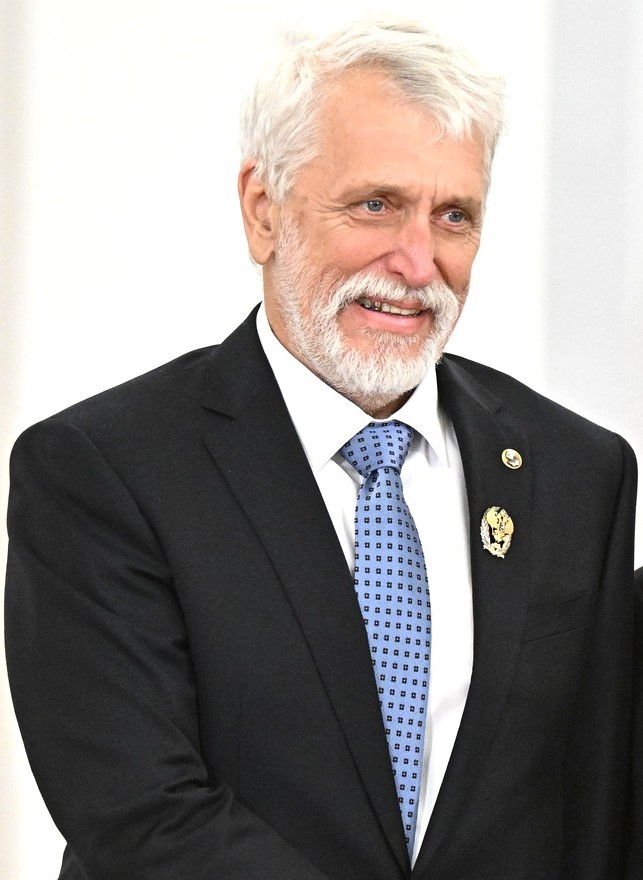
- Born: 22 December 1955 (age 70); Moscow, Soviet Union
- Education: Moscow State University
- Occupations: Scientist, historian
- Employer: RAN Institute of Archaeology
- Awards: (2024)
- Scientific career
- Fields: Archeology, history
- Notable students: Sergei Zakharov

Nikolay Andreevich Makarov (Russian: Николай Андреевич Макаров; born December 22, 1955, in Moscow) is a Soviet and Russian archaeologist and historian, Academician of the Russian Academy of Sciences (2011), Director of the Institute of Archaeology of the Russian Academy of Sciences (since 2003), vice-president of the Russian Academy of Sciences (since 2017), and Academician-Secretary of the Historical-Philological Department of the Russian Academy of Sciences (since 2022). He is a specialist in the archaeology and medieval history of the Russian North. He is the Head of the Archaeology Department at the Faculty of History of the State Academic University for the Humanities. He is a laureate of the State Prize of the Russian Federation in Science and Technology for 2024.

== Biography ==
Born into a family of artists, he graduated from the History Department of Moscow State University, Cathedra of Archaeology (1978). He has participated in archaeological expeditions since 1972; from 1980 to 1998, he headed the Onega-Sukhona Expedition of the Institute of Archaeology of the USSR Academy of Sciences, and since 2001, he has been the project manager for a comprehensive study of the center of northeastern Rus'—the Suzdal Opolye. He has also served as Editor-in-Chief of the journal "Brief Communications of the Institute of Archaeology" (since 2005).

From 2013 to 2017 he served as head of the History Section of the Historical-Philological Department of the Russian Academy of Sciences, Vice President of the Russian Academy of Sciences since September 28, 2017, and Academician-Secretary of the Historical-Philological Department of the Russian Academy of Sciences since September 22, 2022. He is an Honorary Doctor of the Kurchatov Institute (2021). He is also a member of the expert council of the Crystal Compass Prize of the Russian Geographical Society.

Since 2017, Head of the Department of Archaeology of the Faculty of History of the State Academic University for the Humanities.

== Awards ==
- Order "For Merit to the Fatherland", 4th class (July 2, 2021) — for active participation in the project to modernize the bell tower on the Spasskaya Tower and create the underground Museum of Archaeology of the Chudov Monastery on the grounds of the Moscow Kremlin.
- Order of Alexander Nevsky (February 5, 2024) — for significant contributions to the development of Russian science, many years of fruitful work, and in connection with the 300th anniversary of the founding of the Russian Academy of Sciences.
- State Prize of the Russian Federation in Science and Technology (June 10, 2025) — for significant contributions to the archaeological study of the formation of the Russian state and the early history of Rus'. *Gratitude from the President of the Russian Federation (September 14, 2012) — for active participation in the construction of the Hospice on the Jordan River (Hashemite Kingdom of Jordan) and the Cultural and Orthodox Center in Jericho (Palestine)
- Gratitude of the Government of the Russian Federation (June 25, 2025) — for significant contribution to the preparation and holding of events dedicated to the celebration of the 1000th anniversary of the founding of the city of Suzdal, Vladimir Oblast.
- Gratitude from the Minister of Culture and Mass Communications of the Russian Federation (September 7, 2006) — for significant contribution and active participation in the development of the "Methodology for the Economic Assessment of Cultural Heritage Sites".
