= Georgy Isahakyan =

- Георгий Исаакян
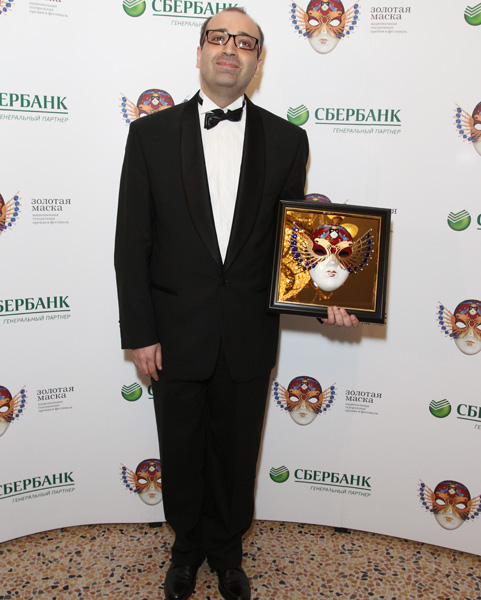
- Isahakyan in 2012
- Born: 7 November 1968 (age 57); Yerevan, Armenian SSR, USSR
- Education: Russian Institute of Theatre Arts

Georgy Georgievich Isahakyan (Russian: Георгий Георгиевич Исаакян; Armenian: Գեորգի Գեորգիի Իսահակյան; born November 7, 1968, Yerevan) is a Russian theater director and teacher. He was awarded the title of People's Artist of the Russian Federation in 2024. He has been the artistic director and chief director of the Natalya Sats Musical Theater since 2010. From 1991 to 2010, he was the artistic director of the Perm Academic Opera and Ballet Theater named after Tchaikovsky. Chairman of the Perm branch of the Union of Theatre Workers of the Russian Federation, Honored Artist of the Russian Federation (2006), laureate of the State Prize of the Russian Federation (1999), laureate of the Volkov Prize of the Government of Russia (2016), laureate of the Stroganov Prize for outstanding achievements in the field of culture and art.

== Biography ==
In 1991, he graduated from the State Institute of Theatre Arts (GITIS), having studied in the Musical Theatre Department under People's Artist of the USSR Vladimir Kurochkin. At GITIS, he was a classmate of such notable theatre figures as Bertman and Mitrofanov.

From 1990 to 1991, he worked at the Yerevan State Conservatory (Department of Opera Training). In 1991, he became a stage director at the Perm Tchaikovsky Academic Opera and Ballet Theatre, and in 1996, he was appointed chief director.

In 2007, the newspaper Kultura named Isaakyan "Director of the Year".

In 2009, he won the Golden Mask National Theatre Award for Best Director (for the opera L'Orfeo, premiered on November 15, 2007).

He serves as the artistic director of a workshop at the Russian Academy of Theatre Arts (GITIS). The workshop's second instructor is Andrey Petrovich Shakun.

Since 2020, he has been a jury member and—since 2022—the chief expert for "Digital Opera," an annual international festival and competition in digital scenography and theatre directing designed for young media artists and multimedia directors.

== Awards ==
- Order of Friendship (October 25, 2018) — for a major contribution to the development of national culture and art, and for many years of fruitful activity.
- People's Artist of the Russian Federation (April 3, 2024) — for great achievements in the development of cinematic, musical, theatrical, choreographic, and circus arts.
- Honoured Art Worker of the Russian Federation (October 16, 2006) — for achievements in the field of art.
- State Prize of the Russian Federation in literature and art (1999) — for the "Opera Pushkiniana" cycle of productions at the Perm State Academic Opera and Ballet Theatre named after P. I. Tchaikovsky.
- Prize of the President of the Russian Federation in Literature and Art for Works for Children and Young People (March 25, 2022) — for an outstanding contribution to the development of the traditions of national musical theater for children and young people.
- Government of the Russian Federation Prize in Culture (2016) (February 7, 2017) — for the production of the opera The Legend of the City of Yelets.
- Government of the Russian Federation Prize in Culture (2025) (November 21, 2025) — for the creation of the creative projects "Seeing Music" (Festival of Musical Theaters of Russia) and the *"Legend" All-Russian Prize for outstanding figures in Russian musical theater.
- Fyodor Volkov Prize of the Government of the Russian Federation for contribution to the development of theatrical art in the Russian Federation (September 10, 2005);
- Stroganov Prize for outstanding achievements in culture and art (2007)
- Golden Mask Award (2009).
