= Aleksandr Chubaryan =

Soviet historian (born 1931)

- Александр Чубарьян
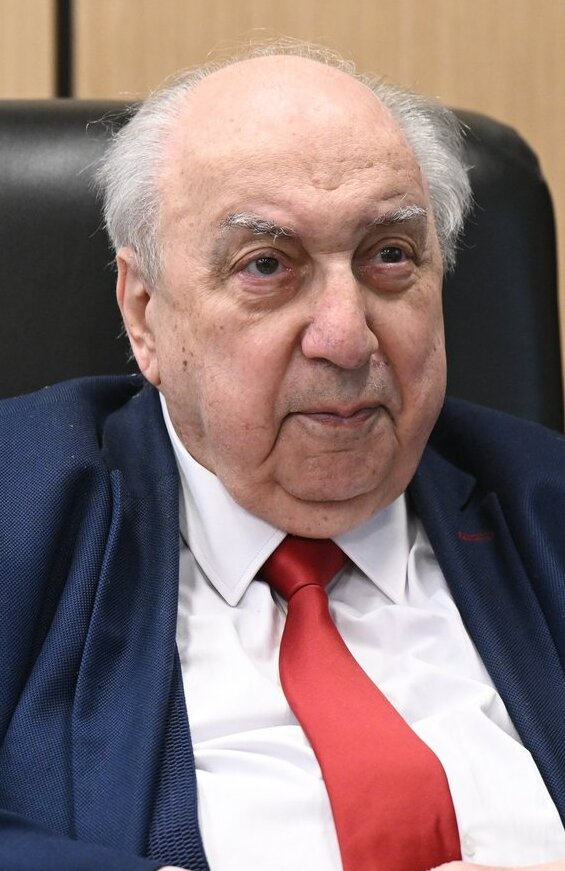
- Born: 14 October 1931 (age 94); Shakhty, Soviet Union
- Education: Moscow State University
- Occupations: Historian, publicist, academician
- Awards: (2013, 2024)

Aleksandr Oganovich Chubaryan (Russian: Александр Оганович Чубарьян); born October 14, 1931, Moscow) is a Soviet and Russian historian, specializing in modern European history and the history of international relations. He holds a Doctor of Historical Sciences (1971), a professor (1979), and a full member of the Russian Academy of Sciences (2000). He has been awarded two times State Prize of the Russian Federation (2013 and 2024).

He is the Scientific Director of the Institute of General History of the Russian Academy of Sciences and the President of the State Academic University for the Humanities. He is also the Chairman of the National Committee of Russian Historians, the Co-Chairman of the Russian Historical Society, and the Chairman of the Russian Specialized School of School History Expert Commission. He is a full Cavalier of the Order "For Services to the Fatherland".[1] He is also the co-author of a Russian school textbook on Russian and general history, published in 2023.

== Biography ==
He was born into an Armenian family. His father, Ogan Stepanovich Chubaryan, was a librarian of international repute, professor, author, and editor of numerous books and articles on library science, editor-in-chief of the collection "Libraries of the USSR" (1964-1975; since 1973, "Soviet Library Science"), and acting director of the Lenin State Library from 1969 to 1972.

He graduated with honors from the History Department of Moscow State University in 1955 and completed his postgraduate studies at the Institute of History of the USSR Academy of Sciences in 1959. A. O. Chubaryan's diploma thesis and PhD dissertation were devoted to the history of the Brest-Litovsk Peace Treaty of 1918.

Since 1958, he has worked at the Institute of History (since 1968, the Institute of General History): junior research fellow, then academic secretary for coordination in 1963, department head in 1972, and director of the Institute from 1988 to 2015. He was also Academic Secretary of the History Department of the USSR Academy of Sciences (1966–1973). In the 1960s and 1970s, he simultaneously taught at MGIMO and the Diplomatic Academy of the Ministry of Foreign Affairs. In 1971, he defended his doctoral dissertation, "Vladimir Lenin and the Formation of Soviet Foreign Policy (1917–1922)". Corresponding Member of the Russian Academy of Sciences since March 31, 1994, in the History Department (General History), and an academician since May 26, 2000.

From 1970 to 1991 he served as vice president of the National Committee of Historians of the USSR, Chairman of the NKRI. He was elected Vice-President of the International Association for Contemporary European History (since 1973), a member of the Bureau and Vice-President of the International Committee of Historical Sciences (1990-2000), and Co-Chairman of the Commissions of Historians of Russia and Austria, Russia and Germany, Russia and Latvia, Russia and Lithuania, Russia and Romania, and Russia and Ukraine (since 1997). From 1996 to 2006 he served as President of the Russian Society of Historians and Archivists. First Rector, Dean, and President of the Russian Center for Humanitarian Education; Head of the Center for Foreign History at the Russian State University for the Humanities. President of the Association of History Institutes of the CIS Countries, Chairman of the All-Russian Public Organization "Association of History and Social Science Teachers", and Chairman of the Governing Council of Moscow School No. 630 named after Twice Hero of the Soviet Union G. P. Kravchenko.

From 1999 to 2007 he served as chairman of the Expert Council of the Higher Attestation Commission of the Russian Federation on History, from 2001 to 2012 as member of the Council on Science, Technology and Education under the President of the Russian Federation and from 2007 as member of the Commission on Religious Associations under the Government of the Russian Federation. He was a member of the Presidential Commission to Counter Attempts to Falsify History to the Detriment of Russia's Interests, which existed from 2009 to 2012. A member of the Russian International Affairs Council and the Russian Paguosh Committee under the Presidium of the Russian Academy of Sciences, he served as a confidant of Russian presidential candidate Vladimir Putin in the 2018 and 2024 elections, becoming one of the oldest confidants.

He is the author of over 350 scholarly publications, including the books "The Treaty of Brest-Litovsk", "The European Idea in History in the 19th-20th Centuries" and "The European Idea in History in the 19th-20th Centuries" (translated and published in the UK and Germany); "Europe in the 20th Century: History and Prospects" (published in the USA, 2002). Editor-in-chief of the "Russian Historical Encyclopedia" and the academic publications "History of Europe" (1992-2000, vols. 1-6) and "World History" (2011-2018, vols. 1-6); editor-in-chief and co-author of Volume VI of "The History of the Scientific and Cultural Development of Humanity" (2002, UNESCO publication), as well as the collective monograph "The World in the 20th Century".

On November 9, 2023, amid Russia's invasion of Ukraine, Canada imposed sanctions on Chubaryan for actively spreading false narratives, disinformation, and war propaganda "about the ongoing invasion of Ukraine, beginning with the invasion and occupation of Crimea".

== Textbooks ==
Chubaryan participated in the preparation of numerous textbooks and manuals on Russian and international history, and served as the scientific director of the Ministry of Education and Science's group developing the Federal Historical and Cultural Standard.

In 2006, Prosveshcheniye Publishing House published a history textbook by A. O. Chubaryan, A. A. Danilov, and E. I. Pivovar. According to some reviews, the textbook explains the origins of the personality cult and Stalinism through political ideas that developed in the 1920s: as we move toward socialism, class struggle will intensify.

In January 2022, he presented a review of the updated concept for teaching history in Russian schools, prepared by the Russian Academy of Sciences jointly with the Russian Historical Society. According to Chubaryan, the concept follows the global trend of expanding the historical role of continents other than Europe. The concept also emphasizes Russia's role in world history.

=== Textbook "General History" ===
In 2023, Chubaryan, together with Vladimir Medinsky, authored a new textbook, "General History", for the tenth and eleventh grades.

The textbook completely rewrote the sections on the history of the USSR and Russia from the 1970s to the 2000s, adding a new section from 2014 to August 2023.

The section "Russia Today. Special Military Operation" covers topics such as Russia-West relations at the beginning of the 21st century, "pressure from the US", "the falsification of history", and "the revival of Nazism". The textbook, in particular, asserts that the "idée fixe" of Western countries is "destabilizing the situation within Russia". The textbook cites Russian President Vladimir Putin, who claimed that Russia attacked Ukraine to end hostilities there. The stated goal of the Russian attack was "the defense of Donbas and the preemptive provision of Russia's security". The textbook's authors claimed that in Ukraine, residents of Donbas were called "terrorists" because "they wanted to remain Russian" while "Great Russians, Tatars, Ukrainians, Dagestanis, and Bashkirs" are called "Russian people".

The German publication Bild called the new textbook "insane," written in a short timeframe, praising the army, and aimed at "combatting dissent".

In response to criticism, Academician Chubaryan said at the textbook's presentation: "Naturally, the textbook 'History of Russia' talks about Russia, which is now being criticized for everything. Of course, this textbook differs from previous ones in that it is a state textbook, approved by the Ministry of Education. "It doesn't feature the opinions of specific authors, as was the case previously. Therefore, it bears the stamp of a certain officialdom. But it is a well-researched textbook. Its main difference is that the general history textbook devotes significantly more attention to the countries of Africa, Asia, and Latin America".

== Awards ==
- Order "For Merit to the Fatherland", 1st class (October 3, 2021) — for significant contribution to the development of historical science and long-term fruitful work
- Order "For Merit to the Fatherland", 2nd class (December 20, 2016) — for significant contribution to the development of science, the training of qualified specialists, and long-term fruitful work
- Order "For Merit to the Fatherland", 3rd class (October 14, 2011) — for significant merits in the field of science and long-term fruitful work
- Order "For Merit to the Fatherland", 4th class (October 14, 2006) — for significant contribution to the development of domestic science
- Order of Honour (June 4, 1999) — for significant contribution to the development of domestic science, the training of highly qualified personnel, and in connection with the 275th anniversary of the Russian Academy Sciences
- Order of the Badge of Honour (1976)
- Decoration "For Beneficence" (September 19, 2019) - for active participation in the preparation and holding of events dedicated to the 100th anniversary of the First World War
- Order of the Legion of Honour (France, 2005)
- Officer's Cross of the Order of Merit of the Federal Republic of Germany (Germany)
- Order of St. Gregory the Great (Vatican)
- Laureate of the State Prize of the Russian Federation for outstanding achievements in the field of humanitarian activity in 2024 (June 10, 2025)
- Laureate of the State Prize of the Russian Federation for outstanding achievements in the field of science and technology for 2013 (June 9, 2014) - for fundamental results of research into the history of relations between Russia and Europe in the 19th and 20th centuries, as well as for a major Contribution to the development of new conceptual approaches to the teaching of history in secondary and higher education in the Russian Federation.
- Russian Federation Presidential Certificate of Honour (January 18, 2010) — for active participation in research, journalistic, and popularization work to counter the falsification of history to the detriment of Russia's interests.
- Presidential Letter of Gratitude (July 11, 1996) — for active participation in organizing and conducting the 1996 presidential election campaign.
- Laureate of the Tarle Prize (RAS, 2009) — for the monograph "The Eve of Tragedy. Stalin and the International Crisis. September 1939 - June 1941".
- Foreign Member of the Norwegian Academy of Science and Letters (1996), the National Academy of Sciences of Armenia (2000), and the Royal Swedish Academy of Letters (2013).
- Honorary Doctor of Saint Petersburg State Humanitarian University of the Unions since 2007.
