= John Edward Allen =

John Edward Allen may be:

- John Allen (provost of Wakefield) (1932–2015)
- John Allen (engineer) (born 1928)
- John Edward Allen (1950–1999), American actor
