= Siberian Branch of the Russian Academy of Sciences =

Academic institution established in 1957

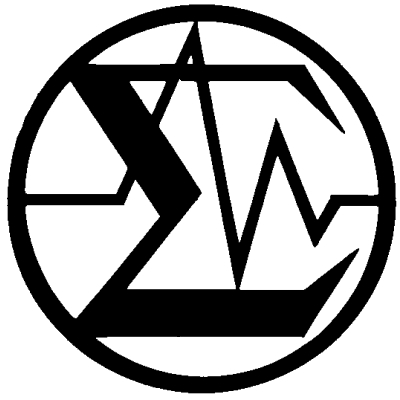
- Established: 1957; 68 years ago
- Location: Siberia, Russia
- Website: https://www.sbras.ru/en/cmn/general

The Siberian Branch of the Russian Academy of Sciences (SBRAS) was established by the Decree of the Government of the USSR which was based on the proposal of Mikhail Lavrentyev, Sergei Sobolev and Sergey Khristianovich in 1957 as a regional division of the Academy of Sciences of the USSR, replacing a previous small branch of the Academy of Sciences of the USSR. Novosibirsk State University was founded to serve as a staff base for the Siberian Branch.

Lavrentyev was also the founding chairman of the branch.

== History ==
During the war, hundreds of scientists were evacuated to Siberia, and in 1943 the West Siberian Branch (WSF) of the Soviet Union Academy of Sciences was created. Initially, the WSF allowed scientists to work in various cities. But since 1948, most scientists have been working in Novosibirsk. Formed in May 1957 on the initiative of academicians Mikhail Lavrentyev, Sergei Sobolev, and Sergey Khristianovich. When the department was organized, it included scientific institutions of the West Siberian Branch of the Academy of Sciences of the Soviet Union (formed in 1943), East Siberian Branch of the Soviet Union Academy of Sciences (formed in 1949), Yakut Branch of the USSR Academy of Sciences (formed in 1949), the Far Eastern Branch of the Russian Academy of Sciences (formed in 1932), as well as the Sakhalin Complex Research Institute of the USSR Academy of Sciences and the Institute of Physics of the USSR Academy of Sciences in Krasnoyarsk.

In 1982, by Decree of the Presidium of the Supreme Soviet of the USSR dated May 4, he was awarded the Order of Lenin.

In 1999 he was awarded the Order of the Polar Star.

Official names:

- 1957 - Siberian Branch of the USSR Academy of Sciences (SBAS USSR)
- 1991 - Siberian Branch of the Russian Academy of Sciences (SBRAS)

Chairmen of the Siberian branch:

- 1957 - Mikhail Lavrentyev
- 1975 - Gury Marchuk
- 1980 - Valentin Koptyug
- 1997 - Nikolay Leontievich Dobretsov
- 2008 - Alexander Leonidovich Aseev
- 2017 - Valentin Parmon

== International collaboration ==
The institution is a member of the University of the Arctic. UArctic is an international cooperative network based in the Circumpolar Arctic region, consisting of more than 200 universities, colleges, and other organizations with an interest in promoting education and research in the Arctic region. The collaboration has been paused after the beginning of the Russo-Ukrainian War in 2022.

== Publications ==
The Siberian branch publishes two journals — Archaeology, Ethnology & Anthropology of Eurasia and Geography and Natural Resource — in association with Elsevier.
