= Erik Galimov =

Russian geochemist (1936–2020)

- Russian: Эрик Михайлович Галимов
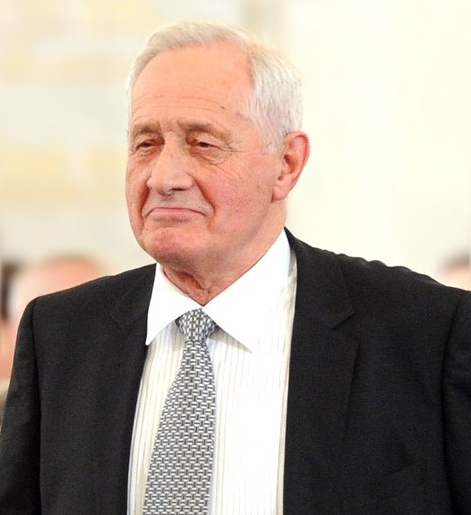
- Born: 29 July 1936
- Died: 24 November 2020 (aged 84)
- Education: Gubkin Russian State University of Oil and Gas
- Scientific career
- Fields: geochemistry
- Workplaces: Lomonosov Moscow State University; Vernadsky Institute of Geochemistry and Analytical Chemistry

Erik Mikhaylovich Galimov (Russian: Эрик Михайлович Галимов; 29 July 1936 – 24 November 2020) was a Russian geochemist and Doctor of Sciences.

== Early life ==
Galimov was born in Vladivostok. He graduated from the Gubkin Russian State University of Oil and Gas in 1959. In 1965, he defended his Candidate's Dissertation. In 1970, he defended his doctoral dissertation. In 1982, he received the title of Professor.

== Career ==
He was Editor-in-Chief of the Russian journal Geochemistry (since 2005). He was also academician of the Russian Academy of Sciences (since 1994), a Distinguished Professor at the Lomonosov Moscow State University (since 1999), and director of the Vernadsky Institute of Geochemistry and Analytical Chemistry, RAS (1992—2015).

== Awards and honors ==
He was elected an Honorary Member of the Academy of Sciences of the Republic of Bashkortostan in 2002. He was elected a Foreign Member of the Akademie der Wissenschaften und der Literatur in 1998. He received the Alfred E. Treibs Award from the Geochemical Society in 2004. He was a Geochemistry Fellow in the Geochemical Society and European Association of Geochemistry (1998). He was also a laureate of the 2015 State Prize of the Russian Federation.

== Death ==
He died on 24 November 2020, aged 84 from COVID-19.
