= Anatoly Grigoriev =

Soviet and Russian physiologist (1943–2023)

- Анатолий Григорьев
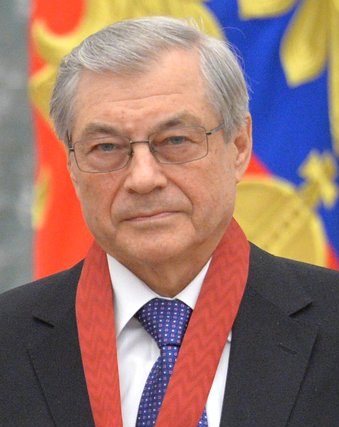
- Grigoriev in 2015
- Born: Anatoly Ivanovich Grigoriev; 23 March 1943; Medelivka, Reichskommissariat Ukraine
- Died: 11 February 2023 (aged 79)
- Education: 2nd MOLSMI
- Occupation: Physiologist
- Employer(s): Institute of Medicobiological Problems of the Russian Academy of Sciences; Moscow State University
- Organization(s): Academy of Sciences of the Soviet Union; Russian Academy of Sciences

Anatoly Ivanovich Grigoriev (Russian: Анатолий Иванович Григорьев; 23 March 1943 – 11 February 2023) was a Soviet and Russian physiologist. He was a Doctor of Sciences (1980), Professor at the Lomonosov Moscow State University, Honored Scientist of the Russian Federation (1996). Laureate of the 1989 USSR State Prize and winner of the 2001 State Prize of the Russian Federation. Disciple of Oleg Gazenko, Grigoriev was one of the leading scientists in bioastronautics and space flight medicine.

== Early life and education ==
Grigoriev was born in Medelivka, Reichskommissariat Ukraine on 23 March 1943. In 1966, Grigoriev graduated from the Russian National Research Medical University.

Grigoriev was a student of Academicians V. V. Parin and Oleg Gazenko.

In 1970, Grigoriev defended his Candidate's Dissertation. In 1980, he defended his doctoral dissertation.

== Career ==
In 1986, he received the title of Professor. Grigoriev was elected a Corresponding Member of the USSR Academy of Medical Sciences in 1988. He was elected a Member of the Russian Academy of Medical Sciences in 1993. He was elected a Corresponding Member of the Academy of Sciences of the USSR in 1990. Grigoriev was a doctor honoris causa of the University of Lyon.

Grigoriev was also Editor-in-Chief of the Aviakosmicheskaya i Ekologicheskaya Meditsina, and the author of more than 500 scientific papers.

From 2007 to 2017, Grigoriev served as Vice-president of the Russian Academy of Sciences. From 1988 to 2008 he was Director of the Institute of Biomedical Problems.

Grigoriev died on 11 February 2023, at the age of 79.
