= Oleg Anikanov =

Soviet military officer (1933–2021)

- Native name: Олег Карпович Аниканов
- Born: 19 July 1933; Moscow, Russian SFSR, Soviet Union
- Died: 24 April 2021 (aged 87) Moscow, Russian Federation
- Allegiance: Soviet Union; Russia
- Branch: Soviet Navy
- Service years: 1956–1993
- Rank: General Polkovnik
- Awards: Order of Lenin; Order of the Red Banner of Labour; Order "For Service to the Homeland in the Armed Forces of the USSR" Third Class; Medal "For Impeccable Service" First, Second and Third Classes; USSR State Prize; State Prize of the Russian Federation

Oleg Karpovich Anikanov (Russian: Олег Карпович Аниканов; 19 July 1933 – 24 April 2021) was an officer of the Soviet and later Russian navies. Over his career he reached the rank of general-polkovnik, equivalent to colonel general, and served as head of the navy's Main Engineering Directorate, and as deputy commander-in-chief of the Navy for construction, engineering support and maintenance.

Entering the Soviet Armed Forces after graduating with a speciality in engineering and construction in 1956, Anikanov spent his career in the navy, working on construction projects in and around the navy's many bases. His early service was with the Northern Fleet, where he worked on the new facilities required by the early generations of nuclear submarines then entering service. For his successes in this field, which included the first dry dock complexes in the USSR for nuclear submarines, he was awarded the Order of Lenin. He was later chief engineer of the military component of the General Staff of the USSR, deputy chief of Severovoenmorstroy, and had responsibility for construction with the Baltic and Northern Fleets. He reached his highest positions in the late 1980s and early 1990s, with responsibility for supervising the construction of naval bases in Cam Ranh in Vietnam, and Tartus, in Syria. He retired in 1993, but remained active in construction and engineering projects, as well as naval alumni associations, before his death in 2021.

== Naval career ==
Anikanov was born into a working-class family on 19 July 1933 in Moscow, then part of the Russian Soviet Socialist Federative Republic, in the Soviet Union. He attended the V. V. Kuibyshev Far Eastern Polytechnic Institute, enrolling in the naval faculty in 1951, and graduating with a degree in military and civil engineering in 1956. He entered the Soviet Armed Forces that year. Between 1956 and 1966 he advanced through the positions of foreman, head of a construction site, and then head of the construction department of the Gremikha naval base, part of the Northern Fleet. In this role he supervised the construction of the first dry dock complexes in the USSR for maintaining and repairing nuclear submarines. For this achievement he was awarded the Order of Lenin in 1965. He undertook the advanced officers' training courses, graduating in 1962.

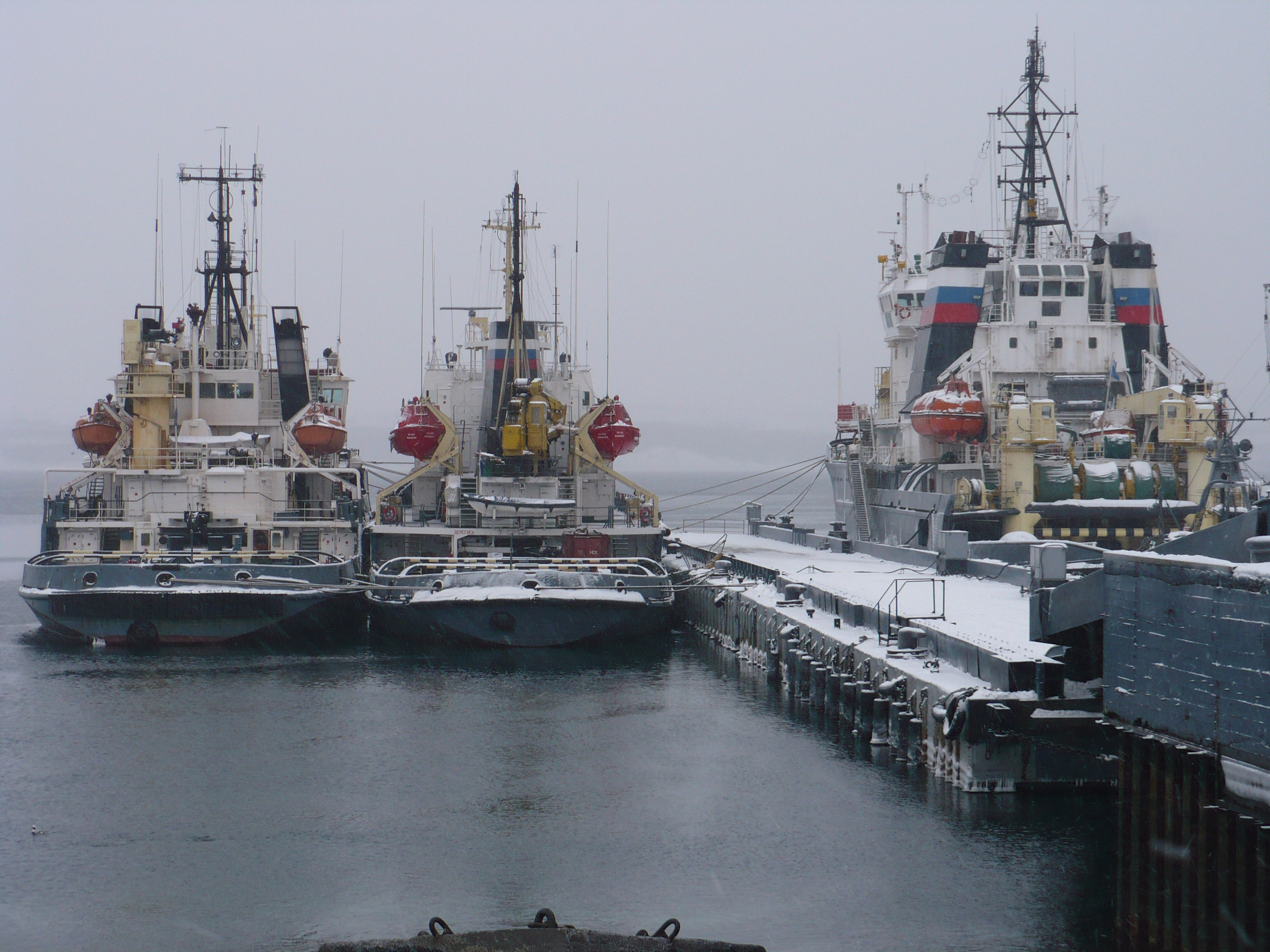
Ships and naval facilities at Severomorsk. Anikanov oversaw the development of the base during the 1960s and 1970s

In 1966 Anikanov became chief engineer of the military component of the General Staff of the USSR, and then in 1968 served as deputy chief and chief engineer of the Northern Fleet's construction organisation Severovoenmorstroy. He was heavily involved in the construction of the main naval base in Severomorsk, and the subsidiary naval bases of the nuclear submarine flotillas, as well as in the creation of facilities for the storage and maintenance of nuclear missiles. He was promoted to general-major on 23 February 1972, and in 1973 he became deputy commander of the Baltic Fleet for construction, and then in 1981 deputy commander of the Northern Fleet for construction. In addition to special naval facilities, his work included overseeing the construction of housing for naval and civilian personnel and their families in the remote northern settlements.

Promoted to general-lieutenant on 17 December 1981, between 1983 and 1989, and again from 1992 to 1993, Anikanov was head of the Main Engineering Directorate of the Navy. Between 1989 and 1992 he served as deputy commander-in-chief of the Navy for construction, engineering support and maintenance. He was promoted to the rank of general-polkovnik on 29 April 1991.

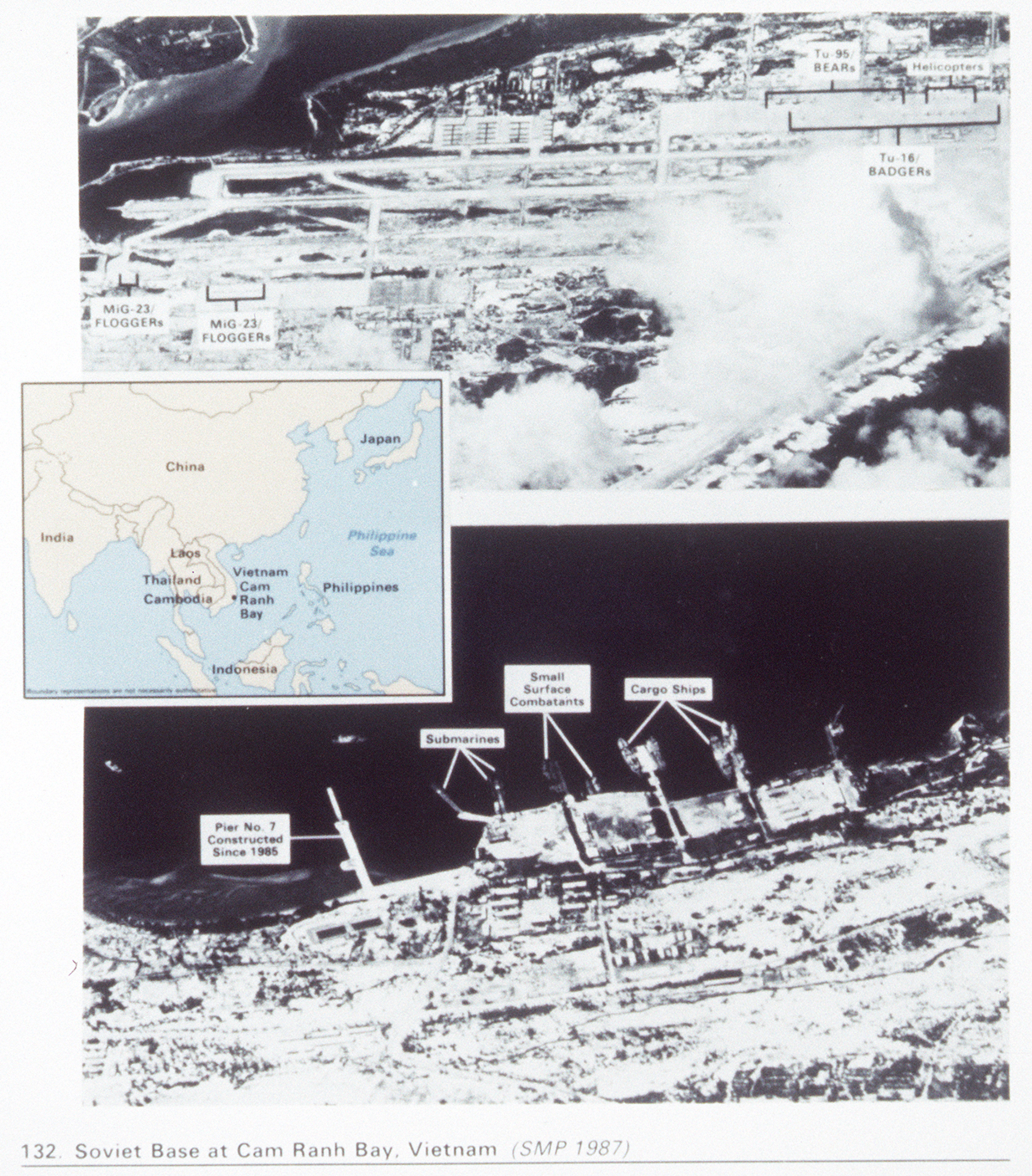
1987 US intelligence images of Cam Ranh Base. Anikanov had a key role in the construction and expansion of the naval facilities during the late 1980s

During these years, Anikanov supervised the construction and introduction into the navy of new basing systems for strategic nuclear submarine missile cruisers. He also supervised the construction of naval bases in Cam Ranh (Vietnam) and Tartus (Syria), and was a member of the state commissions for the acceptance into service of the facilities. Twice a year, in June and December, he would visit Cam Ranh to inspect the progress of construction. He retired from active service in 1993.

== Later life ==
In retirement Anikanov was president of the state unitary enterprise "Intertechservice", advisor to the Commander-in-Chief of the Russian Navy, member of the board and member of the senior council of the Regional Public Organization of Admirals and Generals of the Navy "Club of Admirals", and a full member of the International Academy of Informatization. Anikanov died in Moscow on 24 April 2021, at the age of 87. Over the course of his career he had received numerous awards and honours. Among them were the Order of Lenin, awarded in 1965, the Order of the Red Banner of Labour, Order "For Service to the Homeland in the Armed Forces of the USSR" Third Class, and the Medal "For Impeccable Service" in all three classes. He was also a recipient of the USSR State Prize in 1983, the State Prize of the Russian Federation in 1998, and was an Honoured Builder of the RSFSR. The State Prize of the Russian Federation was awarded on 22 June 1998 for "the creation and implementation of a pre-fabricated reinforced concrete floating quay for the mooring and supply of large surface ships of the Navy and merchant marine."
