= Alexey Shalashov =

- Алексей Шалашов
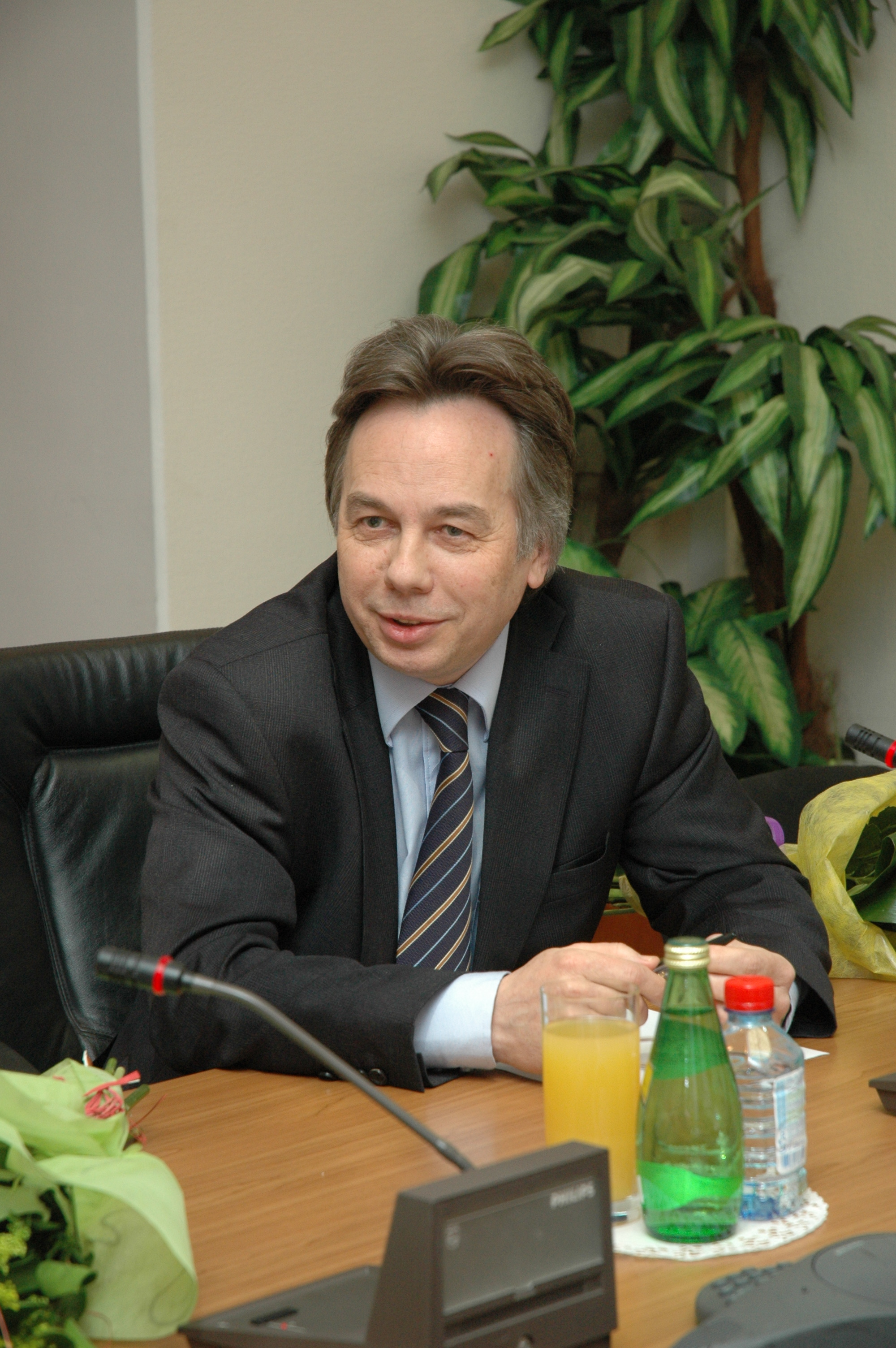
- Born: 15 September 1952 (age 73); Vologda, Soviet Union
- Education: Moscow Conservatory
- Awards: (2024)

Alexey Alexeevich Shalashov (Russian: Алексей Алексеевич Шалашов; born September 15, 1952, in Vologda) is a Russian cultural figure, general director of the Moscow State Academic Philharmonic, and president of the Union of Concert Organizations of Russia. He is Merited Artist of the Russian Federation (1997) and an Honoured Artist of the Russian Federation (2007).

== Biography ==
From 1971 to 1976, he studied violin at the Moscow Conservatory. He studied under Maya Glezarova.

From 1976 to 1998, he was soloist and concertmaster of the second violins section of the Tchaikovsky Symphony Orchestra (until 1993, the Symphony Orchestra of All-Union National Radio and Central Television).

Since 1991, in parallel with his performing activities, he began working in music management. He was the director of the concert agency "Muses of Russia". In 1997, he was awarded the honorary title of "Honored Artist of Russia".

From 1998 to 2001, he was the director of the Tchaikovsky Symphony Orchestra.

From 2002 to 2003, he served as First Deputy General Director of the Moscow State Academic Philharmonic, and then, from 2003 to 2008, as its General Director. In 2008, he headed the Department of State Support for Arts and Folk Art of the Ministry of Culture of the Russian Federation. He combined his position at the ministry with that of Chairman of the Artistic Board until 2012, after which he returned to the position of General Director of the Moscow State Academic Philharmonic, where he currently leads it.

Since 2007, he has been President of the Union of Concert Organizations of Russia.

He is a member of the Government Commission on State Cultural Policy, the Board of Directors of the Russian Authors' Society, and the Council of the Russian Musical Union. He is a member of the Board of Trustees of the International Television Competition for Young Musicians "The Nutcracker".

== Awards ==
- Order of Honour (May 18, 2017) — for significant contributions to the development of Russian culture and art, mass media, and long-term fruitful activity.
- Order of Friendship (November 22, 2011) — for significant contributions to the development of Russian culture and art and long-term fruitful activity.
- Honored Artist of the Russian Federation (July 29, 1997) — for services to the arts.
- Honoured Artist of the Russian Federation (October 10, 2007) — for services to the arts.
- State Prize of the Russian Federation in Literature and Art (June 12, 2025) — for contributions to the development of Russian musical culture and educational activities.
- Laureate of the 2014 Russian Government Prize in Culture (for the "All-Russian Philharmonic Seasons" touring project).
