= Tamara Purtova =

- Тамара Пуртова
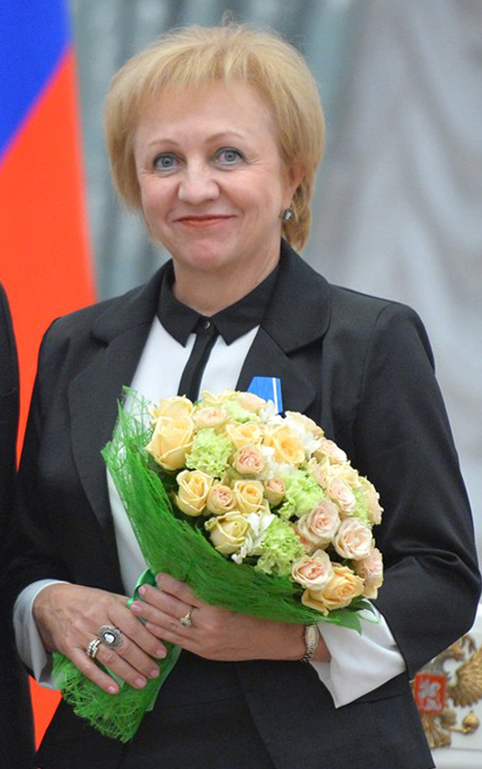
- Born: September 1, 1958 (age 68); Chesnokovka, USSR
- Citizenship: Russia
- Education: Russian Institute of Theatre Arts
- Occupations: Historian, cultural figure
- Awards: (2024)

Tamara Valentinovna Purtova (Russian: Тамара Валентиновна Пуртова; born September 1, 1958) is the director of the State Polenov Russian House of Folk Art, Honoured Artist of the Russian Federation (1999), Candidate of Art History (1990), Professor (2008), and Chairperson of the Russian Committee for the Safeguarding of the Intangible Cultural Heritage under the Commission of the Russian Federation for UNESCO.

== Biography ==
After graduating from the Voronezh Choreographic School in 1976, she worked as a ballet dancer, first at the Dnipropetrovsk State Opera and Ballet Theater, then at the Voronezh State Theater of Opera.

In 1982, she graduated with honors from the Russian Institute of Theatre Arts with a degree in ballet teacher. She then worked at the Ministry of Culture of the Soviet Union, heading the choreography department at the All-Union Scientific and Methodological Center for Folk Art and Cultural and Educational Work until 1990. From 1990 to 1991, she was the chief expert in the department of folk art and artistic associations.

The next stage in Purtova's career involved working at the State Russian House of Folk Art, which unites dozens of specialized centers and artistic groups across the country.

Since 1993, Purtova has taught the history and theory of choreography at the Moscow State Academy of Choreography. She is the author of curricula for universities specializing in choreographic art, the textbook "Teach Children to Dance" (co-authored with A. N. Belikova and O. V. Kvetnaya), and the monograph "Dance on the Amateur Stage".

Purtova is a member of the expert council for the Russian Federation Government Prize "Soul of Russia" and a member of the creative council of the magazine "Ballet".

== Awards ==
- Medal "In Commemoration of the 850th Anniversary of Moscow", 1997
- Honoured Artist of the Russian Federation — for services to the arts, January 8, 1999.
- Government Prize of the Russian Federation in the sphere of culture — for the project "Creation of the All-Russian Information System 'Folk Art of Russia'", December 28, 2005
- Order of Friendship — for services to culture and art, and many years of fruitful work, December 1, 2008
- UNESCO Medal for contribution to cooperation between the Russian Federation and UNESCO in the field of preserving intangible cultural heritage, 2013
- Order of Honour — for achieved labor successes and many years of conscientious work, March 2, 2016
- Certificate of Honor of the President of the Russian Federation — for services to the development of Russian culture and art, September 25, 2018
- Gratitude of the Government of the Russian Federation — for significant contribution to the preparation and holding of the Year of Cultural Heritage of the Peoples of Russia, May 25, 2023.
- Prize of the Government of the Russian Federation in the field of culture — for holding the 6th World Folklore Festival (6th World Folkloriada), December 26, 2023.
