= Yevgeny Sverdlov =

Russian biochemist (1938–2026)

- Евгений Свердлов
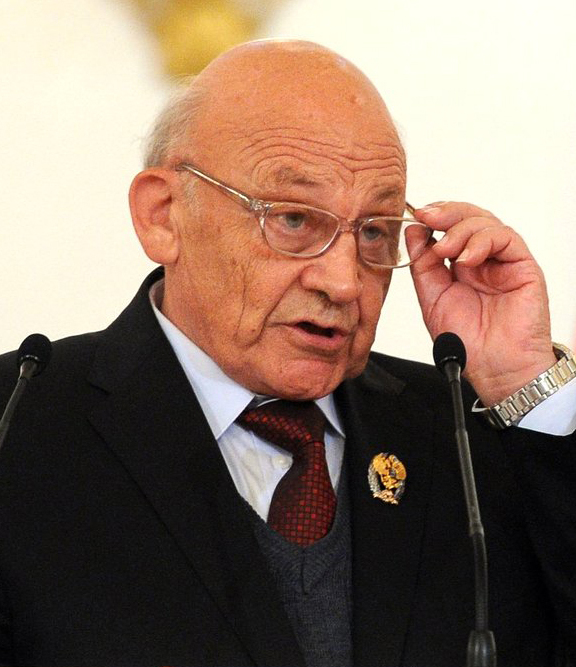
- Sverdlov in 2016
- Born: Yevgeny Davidovich Sverdlov; 16 November 1938; Dnipropetrovsk, Ukrainian SSR, Soviet Union
- Died: 28 September 2026 (aged 87)
- Education: M. V. Lomonosov Moscow State University
- Occupation: Biochemist

Yevgeny Davidovich Sverdlov (Russian: Евгений Давидович Свердлов; 16 November 1938 – 28 September 2026) was a Russian biochemist. A Doctor of Sciences, he was an academician of the Russian Academy of Sciences (from 1997), an academician of the Russian Academy of Agricultural Sciences (from 1991), and a Distinguished Professor at the Lomonosov Moscow State University (from 1999). Director of the Institute of Molecular Genetics of the Russian Academy of Sciences (1988–2006).

Sverdlov was the Head of Laboratory at the Shemyakin-Ovchinnikov Institute of Bioorganic Chemistry, RAS, from 1965.

From 1996 to 1998 he taught at the Boston University (USA).

He graduated from the MSU Faculty of Chemistry. In 1965, he defended his Candidate's Dissertation.

Sverdlov was elected a member of the German National Academy of Sciences Leopoldina in 2001.

He was elected a member of the Academia Europaea in 2001.

Sverdlov was elected a corresponding member of the Academy of Sciences of the Soviet Union in 1984.

Sverdlov died on 28 September 2026, at the age of 87.

== Awards and honours ==
- USSR State Prize (1982)
- Lenin Prize (1984)
- Order of the Red Banner of Labour (1988)
- Order of Honour (1999)
- Order "For Merit to the Fatherland", 4th class (2009)
- State Prize of the Russian Federation (2015)
