= Vladimir Krylov (scientist) =

- Владимир Крылов
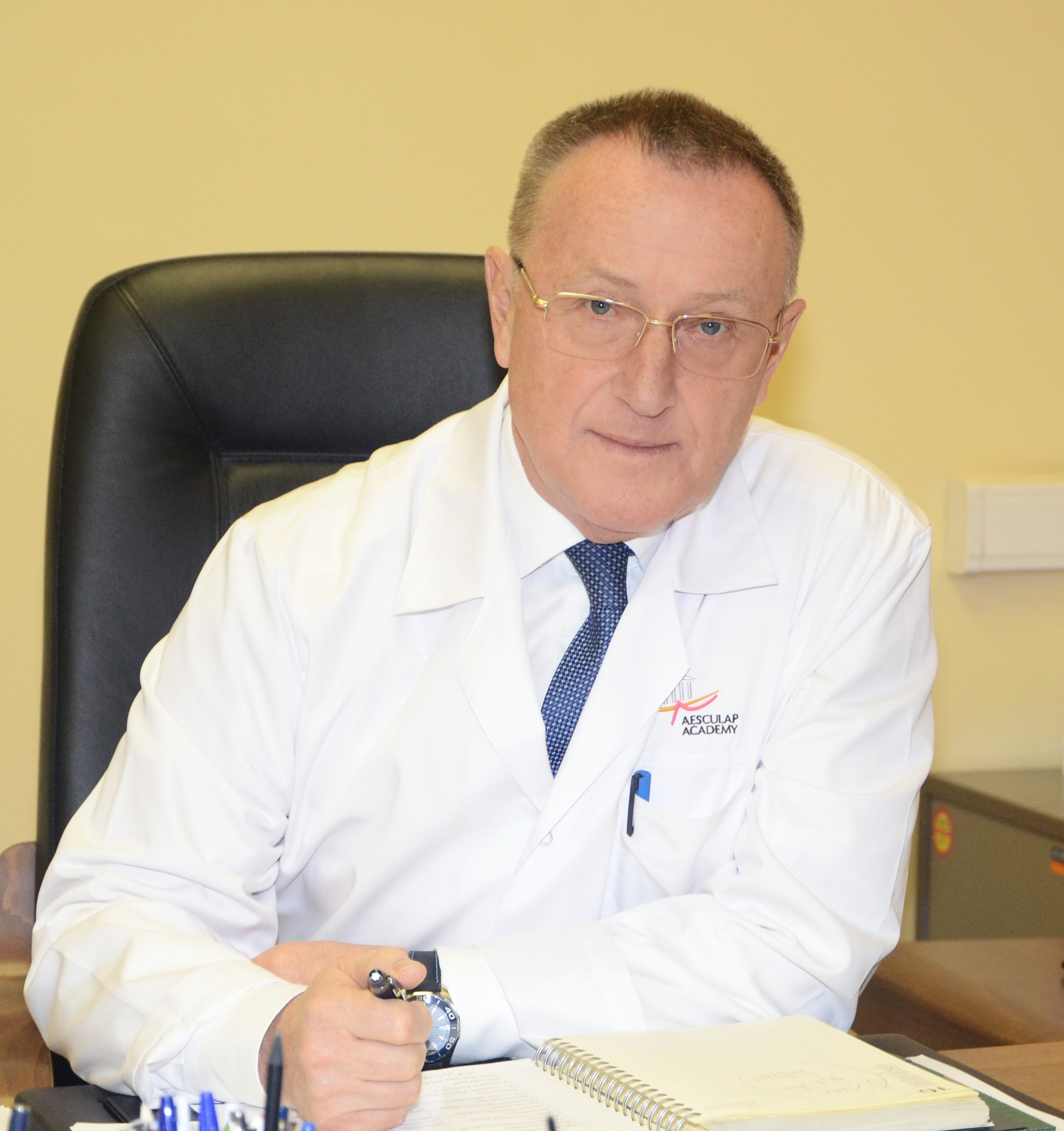
- Born: 11 October 1957 (age 68); Almetyevsk, Soviet Union
- Education: Leningrad First Medical Institute
- Occupation: Physicist
- Employer(s): Russian National Research Medical University; Sklifosovsky Institute for Emergency Medicine
- Awards: (2025)

Vladimir Viktorovich Krylov (Russian: Владимир Викторович Крылов; born March 11, 1957, Almetyevsk) is a Russian neurosurgeon, academician of the Russian Academy of Sciences, professor, doctor of medical sciences, director of the Institute of Functional Neurosurgery of the Russian Center for Neurology and Neurosciences, head of the Department of Fundamental Neurosurgery of the Institute of Neurosciences and Neurotechnology of the Russian National Research Medical University, chief researcher of the neurosurgery department of the Sklifosovsky Institute for Emergency Medicine, and chief neurosurgeon of the Russian Ministry of Health.

== Biography ==
Vladimir Viktorovich Krylov was born on March 11, 1957, in Almetyevsk, Tatar Autonomous Soviet Socialist Republic. He graduated from the First Pavlov State Medical University of St. Petersburg in 1981.

In 1982, he began working at the Sklifosovsky Research Institute of Emergency Care as a junior researcher, later a senior researcher, in the emergency neurosurgery department, where his mentor, Professor Vyacheslav Vasilyevich Lebedev, worked. In 1988, he defended his PhD dissertation on "Prognosis of the Outcome of Early Surgeries for Ruptured Cerebral Aneurysms", and in 1994, his doctoral dissertation on "Early Surgical Treatment of Intracranial Arterial Aneurysms in Vasospasm and Cerebral Ischemia".

In 2005, he was elected a Corresponding Member of the Russian Academy of Medical Sciences. In 2011, he was elected a full member of the Russian Academy of Medical Sciences in the specialty of neurosurgery. Since 2013, he has been an academician of the Russian Academy of Sciences.

From 1993 to 2017, he was the head of the emergency neurosurgery department at the Sklifosovsky Institute for Emergency Medicine.

From 1993 to 2010, he was the chief neurosurgeon of the Moscow Department of Health.

From 2003 to 2022, he was the head of the neurosurgery and neuroreanimation department at the A.I. Evdokimov Moscow State Medical University of the Russian Federation.

From 2014 to the present, he is the chief neurosurgeon of the Ministry of Health of the Russian Federation.

From 2016 to 2019, he was the director of the Clinical Medical Center at the A.I. Evdokimov Moscow State Medical University of the Russian Federation.[9] From 2019 to 2020, he served as Director of the University Clinic at the A. I. Evdokimov Moscow State Medical University of the Russian Federation.

From 2020 to 2022, he served as Advisor to the Rector of the A. I. Evdokimov Moscow State Medical University of the Russian Federation.

From 2022 to 2025, he served as Head of the Department of Fundamental Neurosurgery at the Institute of Neuroscience and Neurotechnology at the Pirogov Russian National Research Medical University.

From 2025 to present, he served as Head of the Department of Fundamental Neurosurgery at the Institute of Neuroscience and Neurotechnology at the Pirogov Russian National Research Medical University.

Since 2024, he has served as Director of the Institute of Functional Neurosurgery at the Russian Center for Neurology and Neuroscience.

== Awards ==
- 1995 and 1998 — Moscow Mayor's Prizes in Medicine.
- 2003 — State Prize of the Russian Federation — for the series of works "Acute Intracranial Hemorrhages: Study of Pathogenesis and Implementation *of New Technologies in Diagnostics and Surgical Treatment".
- 2004 — Honored Scientist of the Russian Federation — for achievements in scientific work.
- 2005 — "My Track" Prize.
- 2007 — "Calling" Prize for the best doctors in Russia in the nomination "For performing a unique operation that saved a person's life" — for performing a series of unique operations to save a paralyzed patient with multiple spinal injuries and fractures.
- 2009 — Medal "For Services to the Chechen Republic".
- 2011 — Order of Honour — for career achievements and many years of dedicated work.
- 2013 — Russian Federation Government Prize — for the work "Development and implementation of a set of minimally invasive neurosurgical methods for diseases and injuries of the spinal cord and spine."
- 2014 — Title of "Honored Worker of Healthcare of the Tyumen Oblast".
- 2014 — Medal "For Services to Domestic Healthcare"
- 2017 — Order "For Services to the Kabardino-Balkarian Republic"
- 2019 — 2019 Moscow City Prize in Medicine — for the project "New Technologies in the Diagnosis and Treatment of Brain Diseases; from Neuroscience to Multidisciplinary Clinical Practice and Mental Health Maintenance".
- 2021 — N. N. Burdenko Gold Medal of the Russian Academy of Sciences — for the work "Development and implementation of innovative methods for the diagnosis and surgical treatment of severe traumatic brain injury."
- 2022 — Russian Government Prize in Science and Technology — for the development and implementation of vascular neurosurgery and intensive care methods for acute cerebrovascular pathology into clinical practice.
- 2024 — "Vocation" Award to the best doctors of Russia in the nomination "For the creation of a new treatment method" — for the work "High-flow bypass in surgery for complex cerebral artery aneurysms".
- 2024 — Order of Friendship of Peoples (Bashkortostan)
- 2024 — Medal "300 Years of the Russian Academy of Sciences".
- 2025 — Moscow City Prize in Medicine — for the project "Development and implementation of methods for surgical restoration of cerebral blood flow".
- 2025 — Russian Federation Government Prize in Education — for a series of original educational and methodological programs "Development and Implementation of Effective Methods of Teaching Innovative Technologies in Emergency Neurosurgery."
- 2026 — State Prize of the Russian Federation in Science and Technology — for the development and implementation of innovative methods of surgery for diseases of the central nervous system.
