= Sergey Khristianovich =

Russian mathematician (1908–2000)

- Born: 9 November 1908; Saint-Petersburg, Russian Empire
- Died: 28 April 2000 (aged 91); Moscow, Russia
- Education: Leningrad State University
- Scientific career
- Fields: Mechanics

Sergey Alekseyevich Khristianovich (Russian: Сергей Алексеевич Христианович, 9 November 1908 – 28 April 2000) was a mechanics scientist from the Soviet Union. Academician of Academy of Sciences of the Soviet Union and then Russian Academy of Sciences, since 1943 (corresponding member since 1939), Hero of Socialist Labour (1969).

Sergey Khristianovich graduated from Leningrad State University in 1930. He has made a huge contribution into development of mechanics in Russia and is well known for his studies in aerodynamics.

Khristianovich was one of the organizers of the Siberian Branch of the Russian Academy of Sciences (SBRAS), one of the organizers of Moscow Institute of Physics and Technology, and a co-founder of Novosibirsk State University.

He was dismissed from SBRAS in 2003.
