= Artyom Kobzev =

Russian sinologist, and historian of Chinese philosophy

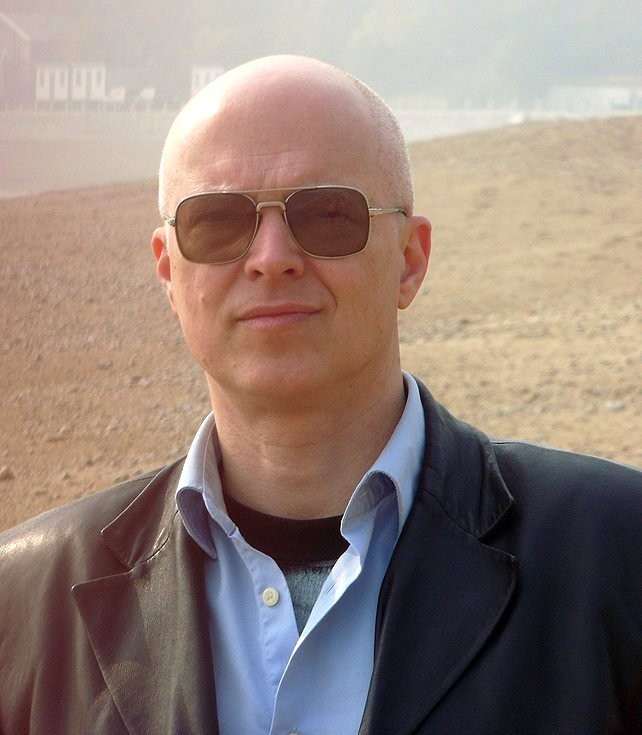
Artyom Kobzev

Artyom Igorevich Kobzev (Артём Игоревич Кобзев / Artëm Igorevič Kobzev; born October 15, 1953, in Moscow) is a Russian sinologist, philosopher, and historian of Chinese philosophy. In his early years he contributed to the in Soviet times started Encyclopaedic Dictionary of Chinese Philosophy (Kitayskaya filosofiya. Entsiklopedicheskiy slovar'), a project which he is continuing now in a modernized and broader form. In 2010 the Russian Federation National Award (in Science and Technology) was conferred on him.

== Life and work ==
Artyom Kobzev was born in 1953 in Moscow. He graduated in 1975 from the Faculty of Philosophy at Moscow State University, earned the Candidate of Philosophical Sciences degree in 1979, and the Doctor of Philosophical Sciences degree in 1989. Since 1989, he has been a senior researcher at the Institute of Oriental Studies of the USSR Academy of Sciences (today the Institute of Oriental Studies of the Russian Academy of Sciences). In 1990–1991, he completed a one-year research fellowship at Peking University.

He worked as Head of the China Department and the Sector for Chinese Ideology and Culture at the Institute of Oriental Studies of the Russian Academy of Sciences; as Director of the Educational and Research Center for Humanities and Social Sciences and Head of the Department of Culturology at MIPT; and as Head of the "Philosophy of the East" Educational and Research Center at Russian State University for the Humanities (RGGU).

His research interests include classical Chinese philosophy, literature, religion, mysticism, and cultural history, complemented by methodological, philological, and historiographical studies, as well as numerological and protological methods, textual criticism, translation, cultural symbolism, and the development of sinology in Russia and globally.

Kobzev is the founder of the academic website synologia.ru.

== Publications (in selection) ==
Kobzev is the author of over thousand scholarly works, including some monographs. - See also synologia.ru

- «Философия Ван Ян-мина (1472–1529)» ("Philosophy of Wang Yangming (1472-1529)") at the Philosophy Department of the Moscow State University. (1979). Ph.D. Thesis
- «Методология китайской классической философии (нумерология и протологика)» ("Methodology of the Classical Chinese Philosophy (Numerology and Protologic)") at the Institute of Philosophy, Russian Academy of Sciences. Dr. Sc., Philosophy (1989), D.Sc. Thesis
- «Драмы и фарсы российской китаистики» - Dramas and farces of Russian Sinology. Editor: Orlova Nataliya. Institute of Oriental Studies of the Russian Academy of Sciences. Москва, 2016

== See also ==
- Mikhail Titarenko (in Russian)
- Anatoly Lukyanov (in Russian)

== Bibliography ==
- Mihail Leont’evič Titarenko et al. (ed.): Китайская философия. Энциклопедический словарь. Moscow 1994, ISBN 5-244-00757-2 (klex.ru)
