= Viktor Moskvin =

Soviet and Russian historian, cultural figure and publisher

- Виктор Москвин
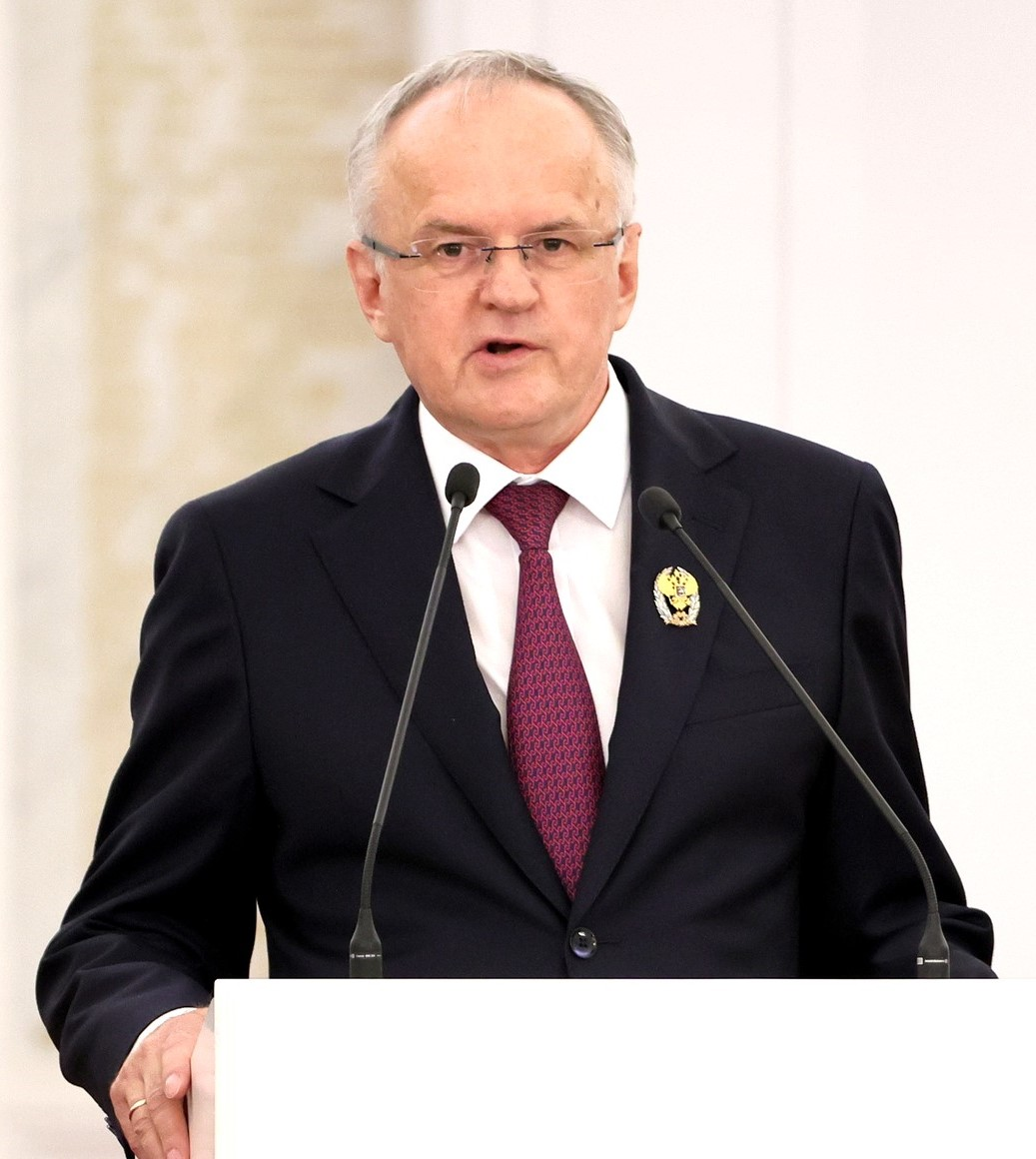
- Moskvin at the Grand Kremlin Palace, June 2022
- Born: January 5, 1955 (age 71); Alabushevo, Moscow Oblast, USSR
- Citizenship: Russia
- Education: Tver State University
- Occupations: Historian, cultural figure
- Awards: State Prize of the Russian Federation; Order of Friendship

Viktor Aleksandrovich Moskvin (Russian: Виктор Александрович Москвин; born 5 January 1955) is a Soviet and Russian historian, cultural figure and publisher. He holds the title Honored Worker of Culture of the Russian Federation (2006) and laureates of the State Prize of the Russian Federation.

== Biography ==
From 1973 to 1975, Moskvin was a researcher at the Ostankino Palace Museum. In 1978 he graduated from the history department of Kalinin State University. From 1979 to 1982 Moskvin worked at the Memorial Museum of Cosmonautics in Moscow; and from 1982 to 1992 he worked in the Margarita Rudomino All-Russia State Library for Foreign Literature, where he worked his way up from junior researcher to deputy general director.

In 1990, Moskvin initiated and organized the first exhibition in Russia of the Parisian Russian-language publishing house YMCA Press at Rudomino Library. This exhibition marked the beginning of the return to the homeland of the historical and literary heritage of the White émigré.

At Moskvin's suggestion, the publishing house Russian Way (general director) was created in 1991, and in 1995, with the support and participation of A. I. and N. D. Solzhenitsyn, N. A. Struve, and Moscow city authorities - Public library-fund “Russian Abroad” (now the state budgetary cultural institution “House of Russian Abroad named after Alexander Solzhenitsyn”).

Candidate of Historical Sciences (dissertation topic “Censorship and distribution of foreign publications in Moscow (second half of the 19th - beginning of the 20th century)”.)

Moskvin is the author of a large number of scientific articles in Russian and foreign periodicals on the topic “Russian Abroad”.

Moskvin is a member of the jury of the Solzhenitsyn Prize (since 2009), a member of the council of the Moscow regional branch of the Imperial Orthodox Palestine Society, a member of the Book Publishing Council under the Government of Moscow, deputy chairman of the public council under the prefect of the Central Administrative Okrug of Moscow, a member of the Government Commission for the Affairs of Compatriots for abroad, member of the council of the Russian Historical Society, member of the public council of Rossotrudnichestvo, member of the supervisory board of the Moscow House of Compatriots, member of the Academic Council of the All-Russian Historical and Ethnographic Museum, member of the board of trustees of the Margarita Rudomino All-Russia State Library for Foreign Literature and member of the board of trustees of Tver State University.

Moskvin is on the list of Putin's confidants (No. 306, since February 7, 2012).
