= Tamara Melnikova =

Russian museum worker, teacher and scholar (born 1940)

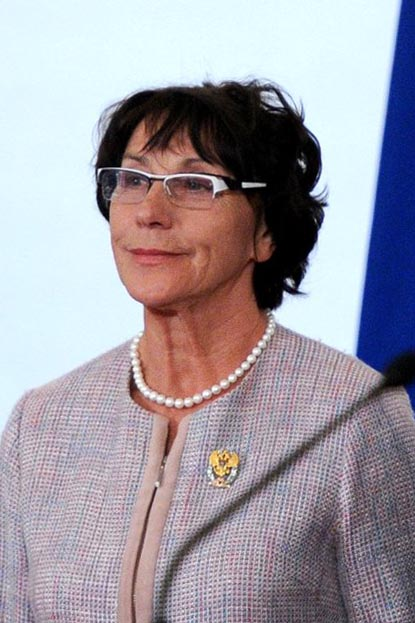
- Born: 9 December 1944 (age 81)
- Education: Penza State University
- Occupation: Museum director of Tarkhany

Tamara Mikhailovna Melnikova (born 15 November 1940, Yarmolyntsi, Khmelnytskyi region, Ukrainian SSR) is a Russian museum worker, teacher, literary scholar. Honoured Worker of Culture of the RSFSR. Laureate of State Prize of the Russian Federation (2014).

== Biography ==
She was born on 15 November 1940 in the village of Yarmolyntsi, Khmelnytskyi region, Ukrainian SSR, USSR.

In 1962 she graduated from the Faculty of History and Languages Penza State University.

In 1962 she started to work as a teacher of the Russian language at the Kruttsovskaya eight-year school of the Kolyshleysky district of the Penza region. In 1968 she began working in the Lermontov State Museum as a senior researcher, soon she was transferred to the position of a chief curator, and later to the position of deputy director for research work.

== State Lermontov Museum – Reserve "Tarkhany" ==
Since 1978 she has been the director of the State Lermontov Museum-Reserve "Tarkhany".

She was in charge of gathering exhibits (about six thousand items), restoring the chapel on the grave of M. Yu. Lermontov (1978–1994), the Church of Mary of Egypt and Michael the Archistratigus (1983–1985), the house-museum (1990–1997), etc. She participated in organizing the A.I.Kuprin Museum in Narovchat, creating a memorial exposition of the V.G.Belinsky Museum, restoring the A.N. Radishchev Museum.

For the first time in Russia in the 1990s, she initiated and organized a set of measures to recreate functioning farms, components of a noble estate of the 19th century, on the territory of the Tarkhany Museum-Reserve (cleaning and stocking ponds, repairing gardens, restoring bee farms, grasslands, etc.).

In 1998–2000, under her leadership, a fundamental renewal of the manor house was carried out with the restoration of its internal architecture.

She is the author of publications on the problems of museum studies, Lermontov studies, local history in the regional and Russian press, a catalog of funds.

== Awards and titles ==
- Honoured Cultural Worker of the RSFSR;
- Order of Friendship of Peoples (USSR, 1980);
- Gold medal of VDNKh (USSR, 1982);
- Order of Honour (Russia, 2008).
- State Prize of the Russian Federation (2014).
- Order of Alexander Nevsky (Russia, 2020).

== Literary works ==
- "And an incomprehensible holy beauty breathes in them." Penza, 1995.
- Museum-reserve "Tarkhany". Guide. Saratov, 1996 (co-authored).
