= John Allen (engineer) =

English engineer and plasma physicist (1928–2026)

John Allen FIEE FIEEE FInstP
- Born: John Edward Allen; 6 December 1928; Devonport, Plymouth, Devon, England
- Died: 19 August 2026 (aged 97)
- Citizenship: British
- Education: University of Liverpool
- Known for: Dusty plasmas, plasma boundaries and the Bohm criterion, plasmas created by ultra-violet light, magnetic confinement, propagation of strong collision-free magnetohydrodynamic waves
- Awards: IEE Achievement Medal for Science, Education and Technology (1998); Distinguished Scientist Award
- Scientific career
- Fields: Engineering science, plasma physics
- Workplaces: Atomic Energy Research Establishment; University of Rome; University of Cambridge; University of Oxford; Imperial College London
- Website: www.maths.ox.ac.uk/people/john.allen

John Edward Allen (6 December 1928 – 19 August 2026) was a British engineer and plasma physicist. In particular, he directly contributed to international dusty plasma experiments in space under microgravity conditions.

== Education ==
Allen gained Bachelor of Engineering (1949), Doctor of Philosophy (1953), and Doctor of Engineering (1963) degrees from the University of Liverpool. His research included experiments with high-current spark discharges involving currents up to 265kA, the highest in any laboratory at the time. He also gained a Master of Arts degree (1964) at the University of Cambridge, and Master of Arts (1965) and Doctor of Science (1975) degrees at the University of Oxford.

== Career ==
During 1952–1958, Allen was a science officer and then senior science officer at the Atomic Energy Research Establishment (AERE, Harwell). From 1958 to 1964, he was a consultant at the Brazilian National Nuclear Energy Commission (CNEN) Laboratory and a professor at the University of Rome in Italy. During 1964–1965, he was an assistant director of research at the University of Cambridge at the invitation of the engineer W. R. Hawthorne. He spent the major portion of his career as a Fellow of University College, Oxford, from 1965 to 1996. He was a Reader (1990–1996) and then Emeritus Professor of Engineering Science from 1996 in the Department of Engineering Science at University of Oxford, when he became an Emeritus Fellow of University College. In 1991, he was editor of the book Gas Discharge Physics with the theoretical physicist Yuri Raizer. He had also been a Visiting Professor in Physics at Imperial College London.

== Fellowships and awards ==
Allen was a Fellow of the Institute of Physics (IoP), the former Institution of Electrical Engineers (IEE, now part of the Institution of Engineering and Technology), and the American Physical Society (APS). He was also a member of the Institute of Electrical and Electronics Engineers (IEEE) Nuclear and Plasma Society. In 2013, a special issue of the Journal of Physics D: Applied Physics was produced in honour of his 75th birthday. In 1998, Allen was awarded the IEE Achievement Medal for Science, Education and Technology. He was also awarded the Distinguished Scientist Award by the International Topical Conference on Plasma Science.

== Death ==
Allen died on 19 August 2026, aged 97.

== See also ==
- List of American Physical Society Fellows (1972–1997) (see 1989)
