= Svyatoslav Gabuda =

Russian physicist (1936–2015)

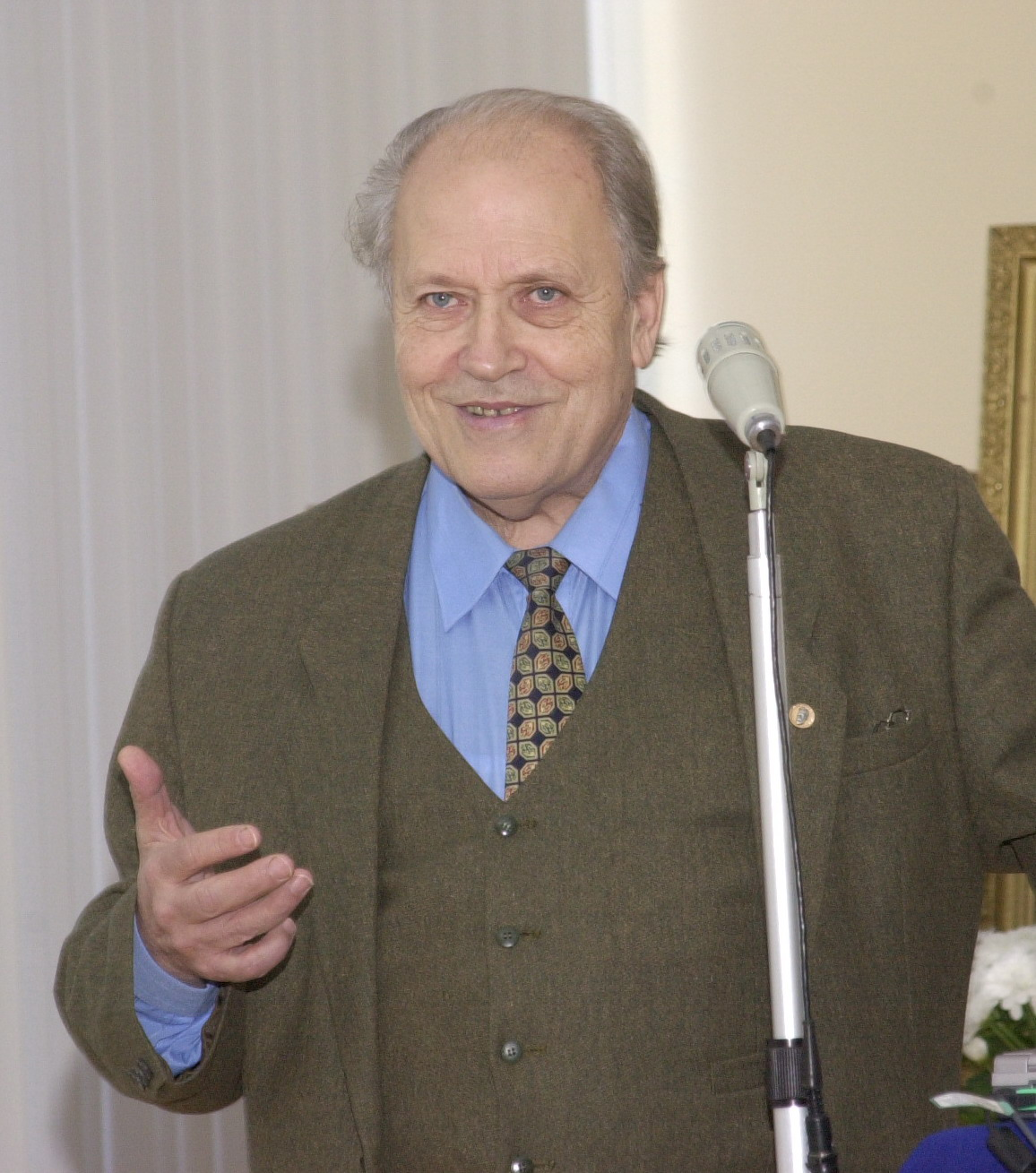
- Born: 23 April 1936; Wołosate, Podkarpackie Voivodeship, Poland
- Died: 7 April 2015 (aged 78); Novosibirsk, Russia
- Education: Odessa State University
- Awards: State Prize of the Russian Federation
- Scientific career
- Fields: Physics, Physical Chemistry

Svyatoslav Petrovich Gabuda (April 23, 1936 – April 7, 2015) was a Russian physicist, professor, and doctor of physical and mathematical sciences.

== Biography ==
Gabuda was born in the village of Wołosate, currently Subcarpathian Voivodeship, Poland, in a clergyman's family. After graduating from the Odessa State University, Gabuda started scientific studies in 1958 when academician Leonid Kirensky invited him to work in the Institute of Physics of the USSR Academy of Sciences in Krasnoyarsk. After reporting his work at the Pyotr Kapitsa’s seminar followed by constructive discussion and feedback, he considered Kapitsa his main authority in science. In 1963, he defended Candidate Thesis on NMR studies of the mobility of water molecules in zeolites and obtained a scientific degree as a candidate of sciences and, in 1970, he defended his PhD thesis "A study of weak interactions in crystals with the method of nuclear magnetic resonance imaging" and obtained a doctorate of physical and mathematical sciences. Since 1968, Gabuda was the head of the Laboratory of Kinetic Processes. In 1972, he received an academic rank of a professor, and a year later he was appointed the head of a new radiospectroscopy laboratory in the Institute of Inorganic Chemistry SB RAS, Novosibirsk, and headed the laboratory until 1991. From 1991 to 2015, Gabuda worked in the Institute of Inorganic Chemistry as a leading and principal researcher in the laboratory of physical chemistry of condensed matter.

Gabuda died April 7, 2015, and is buried in Novosibirsk.

== Scientific activities ==
Gabuda's main scientific interests related to studying electronic structure, molecular and ionic mobility, elementary electron transfer acts, and magnetochemical properties of condensed phases. He proposed a new approach to describe NMR spectra of molecular and ion mobility in solids based on the vacancy mechanism. Further development of this approach led to a new direction in NMR spectroscopy associated with the problems of heterostructured systems such as highly porous crystals and minerals, metal organic sorbents, and biopolymers. Having deep knowledge of various sorbents' properties, he succeeded in attracting the attention of Soviet authorities to natural zeolites as a means to overcome the consequences of Chernobyl accident in 1986. His ideas were also used by Novosibirsk research and production companies such as “Beauty Secrets" and "Siberia-Zeo" which are now actively developing.

The nature of chemical bonding in coordination compounds was a special interest of Gabuda's studies. The results of theoretical and experimental work on the development of methods of spectroscopy and electronic structure of the NMR study of various substances and materials are summarized in his books published in Russia and abroad. Gabuda's scientific results were awarded by the State Prize of the Russian Federation for Science and Technology (together with a group of authors) in 1995 for the work "Radiospectroscopical and Quantum-Chemical Methods of Research in Solid State Chemistry". His last unfinished research was devoted to the problem of detecting and studying molecular transitions from the racemic to the chiral ordered state in solids at low temperatures to simulate conditions of the "cold" scenario of life origin.

== Organizational activities in science ==
Gabuda was the founder and the leader of radiospectroscopy in the USSR and Russia for many years. He expanded NMR to many new areas of application and created a group of other scientists across the country. He was associate professor of physics of the Krasnoyarsk branch of the Novosibirsk State University, professor and lectured at the department of solid state chemistry in Novosibirsk. He took part in work, dissertation councils, was the supervisor of many diploma, master's and doctoral theses consultant. He collaborated with many journals and newspapers such as the "Science in Siberia", "Novaya Gazeta" et al., was a member of editorial boards of scientific and popular book series, a member of the International Editorial Committee "Alternative energy and ecology", a reviewer of the Journal of Structural Chemistry and the journal Applied Magnetic Resonance.

== Books ==
- S.P. Gabuda, S.V. Zemskov. "Nuclear magnetic resonance in complex compounds" (Ed.: Prof. B.I. Peshchevitsky). Science, Novosibirsk, 1976.
- S.P. Gabuda, Yu.V. Gagarinskii, S.A. Polishchuk. "NMR in inorganic fluorides. The structure and chemical bonding". Atomizdat, Moscow, 1978.
- S.P. Gabuda, A.F. Rzhavin "NMR in crystalline and hydrated protein" ( Ed.: Prof. B.I. Peshchevitsky). Science, Novosibirsk, 1978.
- S.P. Gabuda. "Bound water. Facts and hypotheses "(Ed.: Prof. I.I. Yakovlev). Science, Novosibirsk, 1982.
- S.P. Gabuda, A.G. Lundin. "Internal mobility in solids" (Ed.: Prof. E.I. Fedin). Science, Novosibirsk, 1986.
- S.P. Gabuda, R.N. Pletnev, M.A. Fedotov. "Nuclear magnetic resonance in Inorganic Chemistry" (Ed.: Prof. V.A. Gubanov). Science, Moscow, 1988.
- S.P. Gabuda, R.N. Pletnev. "Application of NMR in solid state chemistry." Ekaterinburg, Publ.Ekaterinburg, 1996.
- A.A. Gaydash, V.G. Nikolaev, S.P. Gabuda. "Structure of the myocardium, liver, kidney and physico-chemical properties of the bone under the influence of natural zeolites and fluoride" Atlas electron mikroskopichesih photos, NMR spectra and Raman scattering. (Ed.: L.D. Zykova). Krasnoyarsk State Medical Academy, Krasnoyarsk, 2005.
- E.I. Yuryeva, S.P. Gabuda, R.N. Pletnev. "Quantum Chemistry and Nuclear Resonance Spectroscopy Data of Natural and Synthetic Nanotechnological Materials with nd-Metal Atoms Participations" Progress in Quantum Chemistry Research. (Ed.: E.O. Hoffman). Nova Science Publishers, NY, 2007.
- S.P. Gabuda, S.G. Kozlova. "Lone pairs and chemical bonding in molecular and ionic crystals". (Ed.: Acad. V.M. Bouznik). Russian Academy of Sciences, Novosibirsk, 2009.
- S.P. Gabuda, S.G. Kozlova. "NMR, Magnetic Behavior and Structural Effects of Spin-Orbit Interactions in PtF_{6} and in Related Octahedral Molecules and Fluorocomplexes". Chapter in the book "Handbook of Inorganic Chemistry Research" Series: Chemistry Research and Applications. (Ed.: D.A. Morrison.) Nova Science Publishers, NY, 2010.
