= Natalya Karpovich =

- Наталья Карпович
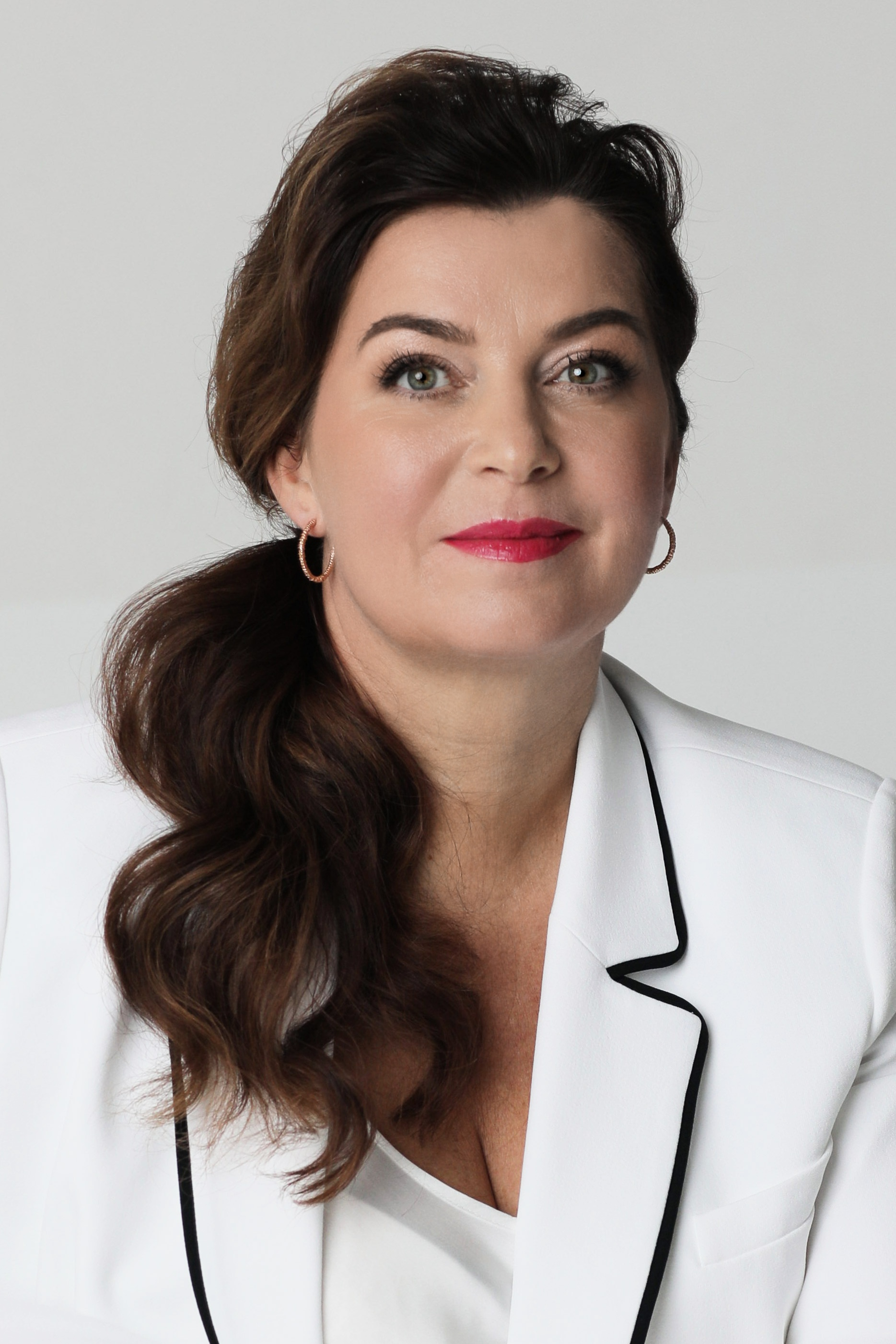

Deputy to the State Duma
- In office 2007–2011

Personal details
- Born: 19 September 1972 (age 54)
- Party: United Russia
- Education: Saint Petersburg State University; Herzen University
- Awards: (2024)

Natalya Nikolayevna Karpovich (Russian: Наталья Николаевна Карпович; born September 19, 1972, Leningrad) is a public and political figure, deputy of the State Duma of the 5th convocation, first deputy chairperson of the State Duma Committee on Family, Women and Children of the United Russia faction (2007–2011), head of the Regional Public Organization "Association of Large Families of the City of Moscow" (since 2014) and President of the Charitable Foundation "Protection of Childhood" (since 2010) Mother of many children: 6 children and 1 adopted child.

== Biography ==
Natalya Karpovich was born on September 19, 1972, to a family from Leningrad.

In 1986, she graduated from State Budgetary Educational Institution Secondary School No. 128 in the Kalininsky District of St. Petersburg, after which she transferred to the Kalininsky District Sports Boarding School, from which she graduated in 1989.

In 1995, she graduated from the Herzen Russian State Pedagogical University (major in Pedagogical Education).

In 1998, she graduated from Saint Petersburg State University (major in jurisprudence).

In 2009, she graduated from the Russian Presidential Academy of Public Administration.

In 2024, she graduated from the Kosygin Russian State University.

She rose through the ranks from the head of a sports section at a St. Petersburg comprehensive school to becoming a World Champion in Veterans Biathlon (2006).

=== Sporting Achievements ===
Natalya Karpovich was a professional athlete: she is a Master of Sports in cross-country skiing, a World Champion among Masters Biathlon, a Master of Sports of Russia in boxing, a member of the first women's boxing team, and a participant in two World and European Championships (14 medals at the Russian and international boxing levels).

In 2000, she won the silver medal at the Russian Championships in the 71 kg weight category.

She organized and hosted a number of international competitions, including Russia-USA, Russia-Sweden, and the first international tournament, which featured 14 countries.

In 2010, an international women's boxing tournament was held in Saint Petersburg with the participation of representatives of the International Olympic Committee. The tournament met the criteria for inclusion in the Olympic program and contributed to the IOC's positive decision to include women's boxing in the Olympic Games.

From 2007 to 2011, she was a member of parliament and first deputy chair of the State Duma Committee on Family, Women, and Children of the fifth convocation, serving on the United Russia party list.

She worked as a presenter on the "Reflection" program on "100 TV" in St. Petersburg, and in 2014, she served as a trusted person in the St. Petersburg gubernatorial elections.

In 2014, at the initiative of the Moscow Department of Labor and Social Protection, she was elected head of the Regional Public Organization "Association of Large Families of Moscow," which represents over 65,000 large families in the capital.

Since 2016, she has been a member of the Public Expert Council under the Moscow Human Rights Commissioner.

In the 2018 presidential elections, she was one of the trusted persons for Vladimir Putin, a candidate for President of the Russian Federation, and co-chaired the Moscow campaign headquarters.

Also, in August 2018, she was appointed Chairperson of the Public and Business Council for the national project "Demography".

Since 2024 she is a member of the Presidential Council for the Implementation of State Policy in the Sphere of Support of the Russian Language and Languages of the Peoples of the Russian Federation.

Since 2024 she is the Chairman of the Public Expert Council for the National Project "Family".

Since 2025 she is a member of the Expert Council under the council established under the President of the Russian Federation for the Implementation of State Demographic and Family Policy.

Since 2025 she is the head of the Working Group on Supporting Large Families and Increasing the Birth Rate of the State Council of the Russian Federation Commission on Family.
