= State Academic University for the Humanities =

Higher education institution

The State Academic University for the Humanities (Russian: Государственный академический университет гуманитарных наук) (GAUGN former GUGN) is a public higher education institution, based on the individual institutes of the Russian Academy of Sciences. It originally bore the name Russian Center of Liberal Education (RCOLE), State University of Humanities (SUOH). The director: Aleksandr Chubaryan, a member of the Russian Academy of Sciences.

== Mission ==
The mission of GAUGN is to install the academic culture and provide information management skills in order to be able to change your career map throughout your life.

== History ==
On April 13, 1992, the Council of Ministers signed Decree №244 on the establishment of the National Center for Humanitarian Education. Another possible date of birth of the university can be considered the date of signing the Order of the Government of the Russian Federation dated 24 February 1994, when the center was given the status of a university.

== Faculties ==
- Faculty of Philosophy
- Faculty of Political Science
- Faculty of Psychology
- Faculty of History
- Faculty of Law
- Faculty of Cultural Studies
- Faculty of World Politics
- Faculty of Sociology
- Faculty of Economics
- Faculty of Economic Management
- Faculty of Oriental Studies
- Institute of Books Culture and Management
