= Evgeny Pokushalov =

Biography of Evgeny A. Pokushalov

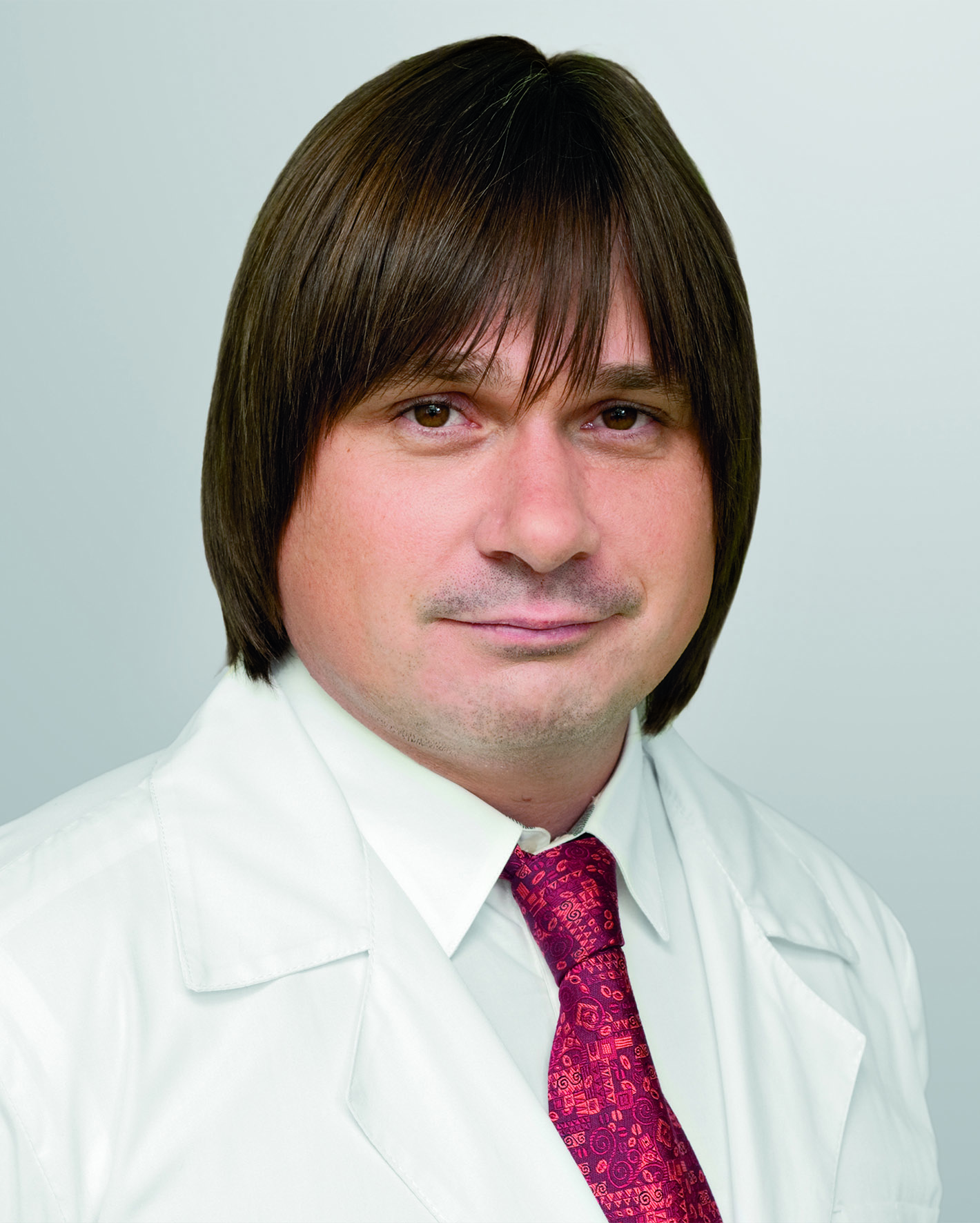

Evgeny A. Pokushalov (Tomsk, Russia, November 7, 1974) is a Russian electrophysiologist.

== Professional qualifications ==
MD (Б-1 077979; University of Russia, 2002), PhD, Professor of Medicine

== Present appointment ==
Deputy Director of the clinics network "New medical technologies center"; Advisor to the Chairman of the Siberian Branch of the Russian Academy of Sciences

== Undergraduate education and qualifications ==
From 1997 to 1999 Pokushalov studied at the Residency of Cardiology in the Tomsk Research Institute of Cardiology (Russia), where he got clinical training on cardiovascular disease. He got practical skills in electrophysiologic studies both with a catheter and intraoperatively. Then he engaged in a postgraduate course of Cardiosurgery during 3 years in the Tomsk Research Institute of Cardiology (Russia), where he got practical experience in conducting scientific clinical research. He also engaged in a postgraduate trainings in Hopital Haut-Leveque, Bordeaux-Pessac, France; St Georg Hospital, Hamburg, Germany; San Raffaele University Hospital, Milan, Italy; Harvard Medical School, USA.

== Clinical and scientific activity ==
Since the completion of the training in 1999 Pokushalov devoted his professional time to clinical cardiac electrophysiology, including both clinical and scientific activities serving as the primary operator in the electrophysiology laboratory, collecting and analyzing clinical data, initiating inner clinical studies, follow-up clinic etc. At the moment Pokushalov has presentations and original publications. His h index is 28 (the h Index considers Scopus articles published after 1995). Pokushalov took a part as a principal investigator and co-investigator in 30 international multicenter clinical studies since 2005. Since 2016 Pokushalov became a member of the Expert Council of Russian Academy of Sciences.

== Membership of professional associations and colleges ==
Pokushalov is a member of Russian Society of Pacing and Electrophysiology, Member of European Society of Cardiology, Member of American Heart Association, Fellow member of European Society of Cardiology, Fellow member of American College of Cardiology and Fellow member of Heart Rhythm Society. Since December 2016 - Fellow of European Heart Rhythm Association.
