= Yuri Raizer =

Soviet physicist (1927–2021)

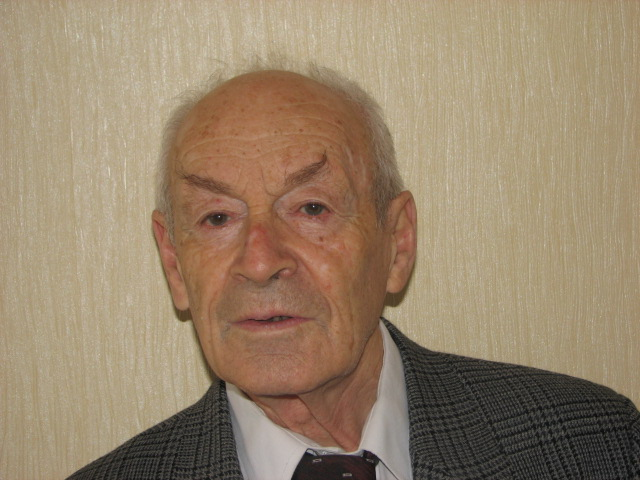
- Yuri Petrovich Raizer
- Born: Yuri Petrovich Raizer; 26 January 1927; Kharkiv
- Died: 25 June 2021 (aged 94); Moscow, Russia
- Education: Leningrad Polytechnic Institute, USSR
- Awards: Lenin Prize (1966); State Prize of the Russian Federation (1999); USA, Penning Award Excellence, (1993); USA, AIAA Plasmadynamics & Lasers Award (2002).
- Scientific career
- Fields: Physics
- Workplaces: Ishlinsky Institute for Problems in Mechanics of the Russian Academy of Sciences, Moscow, Russia

Yuri Petrovich Raizer (Russian: Юрий Петрович Райзер, 26 January 1927 – 25 June 2021) was a prominent Soviet and Russian theoretical physicist.

Raizer was born in Kharkiv, USSR. He received his PhD degree in 1953 and his Doctor of Sciences degree in 1959. He was Senior Research Fellow at the Ishlinsky Institute for Problems in Mechanics of the Russian Academy of Sciences, Moscow, Russia where he served as a head of the Division of Physics of gas dynamic processes since 1965. Additionally, he was professor at the Moscow Institute of Physics and Technology since 1968.

Raizer worked in various fields including gas dynamics, low-temperature plasma, explosion physics, gas discharge physics, the interaction of laser radiation with ionized gas, and the physics of lightning. He wrote over 200 papers, eight books (six in English), and three patents. His "Physics of Shock Waves and High-Temperature Hydrodynamic Phenomena", co-authored with Yakov Zeldovich (in English, 1968, 2002), and "Gas Discharge Physics" (in English, 1991, 1997) are well known handbooks for researchers and students.

== Bibliography ==
- Ya. B. Zel'dovich, Yu. P. Raizer. Physics of Shock Waves and High-Temperature Hydrodynamic Phenomena. Academic Press, New York, 1968; Dover Publications Inc. Mineola, New York, 2002.
- Yu. P. Raizer. Laser-Induced Discharge Phenomena. Consultants Bureau, New York, London, 1977.
- Yu. P. Raizer. Gas Discharge Physics. Springer, Berlin, New York, 1991, 1997.
- Yu. P. Raizer, M. N. Shneider, and N. A. Yatsenko. Radio-Frequency Capacitive Discharges. CRC Press, Boca Raton, New York, 1995.
- E. M. Bazelyan, Yu. P. Raizer. Spark Discharge. CRC Press, Boca Raton, New York, 1998.
- E. M. Bazelyan, Yu. P. Raizer. Lightning Physics and Lightning Protection. IOP Publishing, Bristol, Philadelphia, 2000.
