= Mikhail Alfimov =

Russian professional football player

Personal information
- Full name: Mikhail Yuryevich Alfimov
- Date of birth: 19 August 1987 (age 39)
- Place of birth: Yelets, Lipetsk Oblast, Russian SFSR
- Height: 1.87 m (6 ft 1 1/2 in)
- Position: Goalkeeper

Youth career
- FC Yelets

Senior career*
Years	Team	Apps	(Gls)
2004	FC Yelets	0	(0)
2006–2009	FC Yelets	47	(0)
2009–2010	FC Dynamo Saint Petersburg	12	(0)
2011	FC Metallurg Lipetsk	6	(0)
2012–2013	FC Yelets (amateur)		
2014–2016	FC Lokomotiv Liski	24	(0)
2016–2020	FC Metallurg Lipetsk	32	(0)
- * Club domestic league appearances and goals

Mikhail Yuryevich Alfimov (Russian: Михаил Юрьевич Алфимов; born 19 August 1987) is a Russian former professional football player.

== Club career ==
He made his Russian Football National League debut for FC Dynamo Saint Petersburg on 12 June 2010 in a game against FC Irtysh Omsk.
