= Stroganov Prize =

- Awarded for: High achievements in various fields of activity of people who have brought glory to the Perm Krai and its residents through their deeds
- Country: Russia
- Presented by: Perm community
- First award: 2005
- Website: Official site of the Perm community

The Stroganov Prize is the award for high achievements in various fields of activity of people who have brought glory to the Perm Krai and its residents through their deeds, presented by the Perm community at the initiative of entrepreneur Andrei Kuzyayev. It has been awarded annually since 2006.

Nominations:

- For outstanding achievements in sports;
- For honor and dignity;
- For outstanding achievements in public life;
- For outstanding achievements in economics and management;
- Small and medium business leader;
- For outstanding achievements in science and technology;
- For high achievements in the field of education and upbringing of youth;
- For outstanding achievements in art and culture.
