= Valentin Parmon =

Russian scientist (born 1948)

- Валенти́н Никола́евич Пармóн
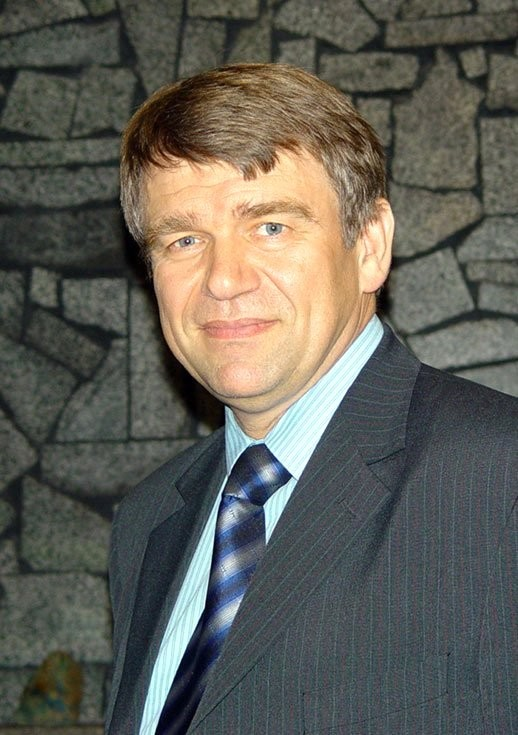
- Valentin Parmon in 2010
- Born: 18 April 1948 (age 78); Brandenburg, Germany
- Education: Moscow Institute of Physics and Technology
- Known for: Catalytic processes
- Awards: State Prize of the Russian Federation in science and technology (2009); Global Energy Prize (2016)
- Scientific career
- Fields: Chemistry
- Workplaces: Boreskov Institute of Catalysis, Novosibirsk

Valentin Nikolayevich Parmon (Russian: Валенти́н Никола́евич Пармóн; born 18 April 1948 in Brandenburg) is a Russian scientist who is credited with inventing new and improved catalytic processes in the field of energy technology.

== Career ==
Parmon graduated from the Moscow Institute of Physics and Technology in 1972 and received a postgraduate physical and mathematical sciences degree from the same institution in 1975. He went on to work as a researcher, first at the Semenov Institute of Chemical Physics in Moscow, and then from 1977, at the Boreskov Institute of Catalysis in Novosibirsk. From 1995 to 2015, he served as the director of the institute, and he is currently (2016) its scientific advisor.

Parmon received a chemistry doctorate in 1985 and was appointed professor in 1989. He has been a full member of the Russian Academy of Sciences since 1997.

His research interests have included chemical kinetics, photocatalysis, catalytic conversion of fossil fuels, chemical storage of renewable energy and conversion of biomass into fuel. In particular, he led the development of commercially successful new catalytic processes for producing fuel compliant with the Euro 4 and Euro 5 standards and the creation of an experimental system for chemically storing solar energy at an efficiency of 43 percent. The institute that he headed has also developed catalytic processes for combustion of low-quality fuels. These have been commercially applied to coal-fired boilers and may potentially be used for producing energy from wastewater treatment sludge.

In 2009, Parmon was awarded the State Prize of the Russian Federation in science and technology, and in 2016, the Global Energy Prize for the development of new catalysts for petroleum refining and renewable energy.
