= Imperial Russian Historical Society =

Historical society

The Imperial Russian Historical Society (Russian: Императорское Русское историческое общество) was a public organization of Imperial Russia. It was subject to the jurisdiction of the Ministry of National Education. It was founded in 1866 and dissolved in 1917. It published studies on Russian history and historical documents connected with the Imperial Russian state. It is most notable as the publisher of the Russian Biographical Dictionary. Its emblem was an image of the Monument to Minin and Pozharsky.

== History ==
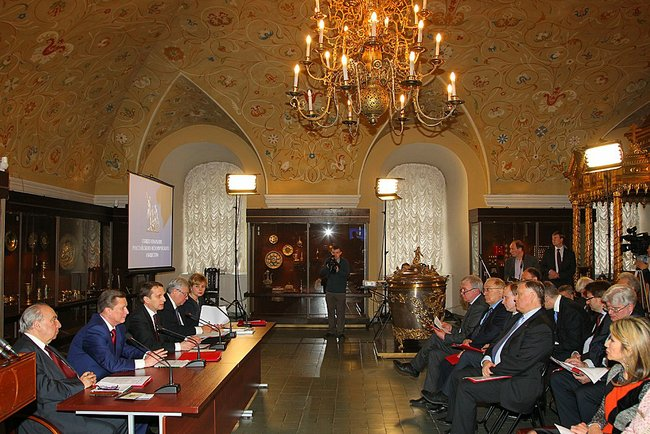
Revived Russian Historical Society meeting in Kremlin on February 27, 2013

It was founded in March 1866 by local and military historians and government officials, with its charter approved on 23 May 1866 by Alexander II of Russia and stating its purpose as being "to contribute fully to the development of education in Russian national history". The Society received the highest approval of Alexander II and by his consent it promoted the development of civic education in Russia. On 24 November 1873 it was given the name the "Imperial Russian Historical Society."

In 2013, the Russian President Vladimir Putin charged the RHS to select the existing history textbooks of different publishers in order to build up a uniform teaching of the national history within all the Russian schools. Since the scholastic year 2014/2015, Russian teachers were forbidden to adopt history textbooks that hadn't pass the RHS preventive approval.

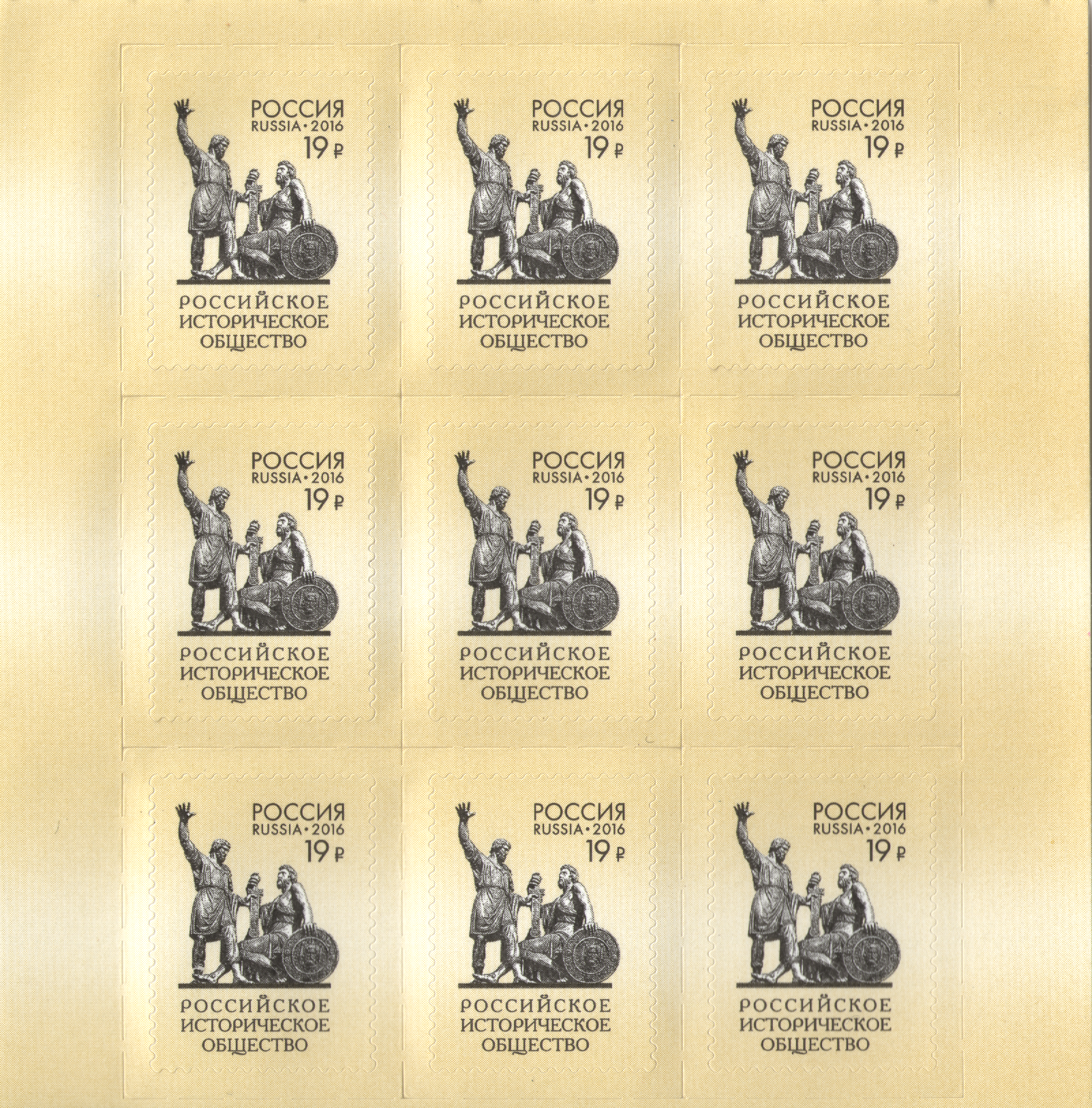
Russian Historical Society on a postage stamp of Russia.

== Members ==
There were three main levels of member - full, honorary and 'соревнователи' (sorevnovateli) - along with foreign honorary members and corresponding members. Any member had to have focussed on the history of the Russian state. The founder members included:

- Pyotr Vyazemsky
- Alexander Polovtsov
- Konstantin Bestuzhev-Ryumin
- Modest Iwanowitsch Bogdanowitsch
- Dmitry Tolstoy

It was governed by a board, made up of a president, assistant president, three members, the secretary and the treasurer.

== Bibliography ==
- Kollektiv Authorov (2015). Collection of the imperial russian historical society. Vol. 148. Books on Demand. OCLC 972633044.
