= Gratitude of the Government of the Russian Federation =

Honorary award bestowed by the Government of Russia

Letter of Gratitude from the Government of the Russian Federation
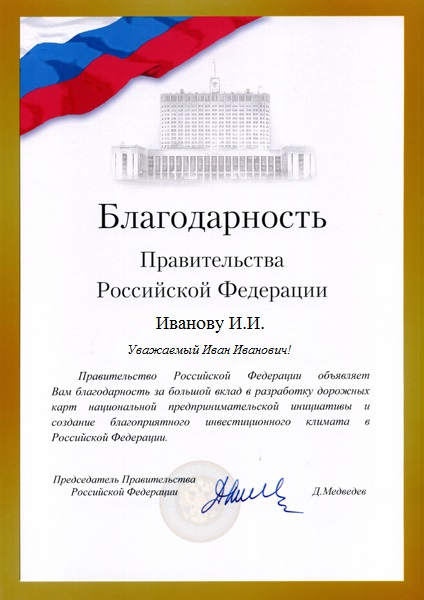
- Letter of Gratitude from the Government of the Russian Federation
- Native name: Благодарность Правительства Российской Федерации
- Type: Government Award, Gratitude
- Awarded for: Service to the Russian Federation Contributions to Government Policy Meritorious Service to the State
- Presented by: Russian Federation
- Eligibility: Citizens of the Russian Federation, generally with broad public recognition, organizations, and military units
- Status: Active
- Established: January 31, 2009
- Website: government.ru

The Gratitude of the Government of the Russian Federation (Russian: Благодарность Правительства Российской Федерации) is a form of encouragement established by Decree of the Government of the Russian Federation No. 73 of January 31, 2009, "On the Certificate of Honor of the Government of the Russian Federation and the Gratitude of the Government of the Russian Federation."

== Description ==
The Gratitude from the Government of the Russian Federation was established by Government Decree No. 73 of January 31, 2009, "On the Certificate of Honour of the Government of the Russian Federation and the Letter of Gratitude from the Government of the Russian Federation." This decree approved the regulations on the Certificate of Honor of the Government of the Russian Federation and on the declaration of gratitude from the Government of the Russian Federation, a specimen of the certificate form, and a description and drawing of the badge for the certificate.

In accordance with the regulations, the Letter of Gratitude from the Government of the Russian Federation is a form of encouragement for meritorious service in facilitating the implementation of state social and economic policy, ensuring the effective functioning of federal government bodies, developing local self-government, guaranteeing legality and the rights and freedoms of citizens, strengthening the country's defense capabilities and state security, implementing the state's foreign policy, and exercising other powers vested in the Government of the Russian Federation by the Constitution of the Russian Federation, federal constitutional laws, federal laws, and decrees of the President of the Russian Federation.

The Letter of Gratitude is presented by the Prime Minister of the Russian Federation or, on their behalf, by members of the Government of the Russian Federation or other officials. Re-awarding of the Letter of Gratitude is not permitted. Duplicates of the Letter of Gratitude and its badge are not issued to replace lost ones.

== Literature ==
- Vinokurov V. A. New Awards of the President and Government of the Russian Federation: Similarities and Differences // Constitutional and Municipal Law. — 2009. — No. 22. — pp. 10–14.
