= Gaynor Minden =

American dancing equipment manufacturer

Gaynor Minden, Inc.
- Trade name: Gaynor Minden
- Industry: clothing pointe shoe manufacturer
- Founded: 1993
- Founder: John Minden; Eliza Gaynor Minden
- Headquarters: New York City
- Products: shoes; clothing; accessories; training aids
- Services: dancewear
- Website: dancer.com

Gaynor Minden is the trade name of Gaynor Minden, Inc., an American company that makes shoes, clothing, accessories, and training aids for dancers.

== History ==
Gaynor Minden was founded in 1993 by husband and wife John Minden and Eliza Gaynor Minden in their New York City apartment. Its only product was the patented pointe shoe that Eliza, a devoted amateur dancer, had designed and developed over the preceding eight years — the first pointe shoe to successfully utilize modern materials in its construction.

In 1993, Gaynor Minden opened a boutique in the parlor of a nineteenth-century brownstone in the Chelsea neighborhood of Manhattan, where customers are fitted for pointe shoes by a staff of specially trained dancers and former dancers. Gaynor Minden also sold shoes by mail order using detailed questionnaires and foot tracings and established a wholesale business serving specialty dance wear stores. In 1996 John Minden secured the domain dancer.com, making Gaynor Minden the first pointe shoe available on the internet.

The original line of pointe shoes grew widely, and now includes an extensive range of size, shape, stiffness, and satin options for stock shoes. Further customizations are available by special order. All pointe shoes are handmade in Bosnia and Herzegovina. The original USA factory closed in 2020.

Distribution extends to over 80 countries and to over 200 major ballet companies.

== Products ==
Gaynor Minden specializes in shoes and clothing specifically for ballet dancers, but over the years it has expanded its offerings to include technique slippers, leotards, tights, warm ups, accessories, tutus, and training aids suitable for other types of dance as well as ballet.

== Pointe Shoe Manufacturing ==
Gaynor Minden's unique manufacturing system employs injection molded, thermoplastic elastomeric shanks and toe boxes, in a choice of stiffness. Impact and noise absorbing cellular urethane cushioning is located throughout the shoe. The exterior is traditional satin and a suede outer sole; the linings are treated with silver ion and combined directly to the satin. An elastic drawstring opens at the side. Unlike turnshoe manufacturing pleats are not used.

== Notable Users ==
- Gillian Murphy, Principal Dancer, American Ballet Theatre
- Svetlana Zakharova, Principal Dancer, The Bolshoi Ballet
- Ekaterina Kondaurova, Principal Dancer, The Mariinsky Ballet
- Zenaida Yanowsky, Principal Dancer, The Royal Ballet
- Alina Cojocaru, Principal Dancer, English National Ballet
- Jurgita Dronina, Principal Dancer, National Ballet of Canada
- Amanda Green, Principal Dancer, Royal Winnipeg Ballet
- Igone de Jonge, Principal Dancer, Dutch National Ballet
- Erica Cornejo, Principal Dancer, Boston Ballet
- Viengsay Valdes, Prima Ballerina, Ballet Nacional de Cuba
- Evgenia Obraztsova, Principal Dancer, The Bolshoi Ballet
- Ekaterina Shipulina, Principal Dancer, The Bolshoi Ballet
- Olga Smirnova, Principal Dancer, The Bolshoi Ballet
- Laura Bosenberg, Principal Dancer, Cape Town City Ballet
- Claudia Mota, Principal Dancer, Theatro Municipal do Rio de Janeiro
- Alina Somova, Principal Dancer, The Mariinsky Ballet
- Michaela de Prince, Soloist, Dutch National Ballet
- Maria Riccetto, Prima Ballerina, Ballet National del Sodre
- Nadia Muzyca, Principal Dancer, Teatro Colón
