= Andrei Korobtsov =

- Андрей Коробцов
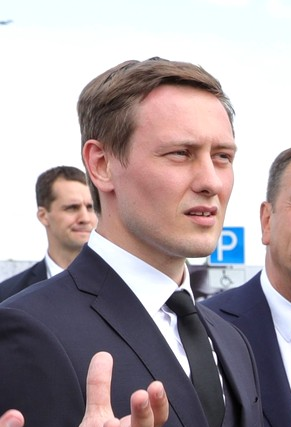
- Born: April 27, 1987 (age 39); Moscow
- Education: Russian Academy of Painting, Sculpture and Architecture
- Known for: Sculptor
- Notable work: Rzhev Memorial to the Soviet Soldier
- Spouse: Evgenia Obraztsova
- Awards: (2023)

Andrei Sergeyevich Korobtsov (Russian: Андрей Сергеевич Коробцов; born 27 April 1986 in Jezkazgan) is a Russian sculptor, member of the Moscow Union of Artists. He is the author of more than 200 works, including 40 monuments.

== Biography ==
Born in 1987 in Jezkazgan, Kazakh SSR. His mother, Lyudmila Alekseyevna, is an engineer. His father, Sergei Petrovich, is a welder at a mining and processing plant in Gubkin. In 1994, the Korobtsov family moved to Gubkin, where he graduated from comprehensive and art schools. Then Andrei went to Moscow to study the art of sculpting. In 2011, he graduated from the sculpture department of the Russian Academy of Painting, Sculpture and Architecture (supervisors: Salavat Scherbakov and M. O. Krasilnikov) with his diploma work "Yevgeny Rodionov". Since 2011, Andrei Korobtsov has been a member of the Moscow Union of Artists and is actively working in the field of monumental sculpture. He lives and works in Moscow.

In 2010, Andrey Korobtsov, together with the architect Konstantin Fomin, founded an architectural and sculpture studio in Moscow. Over the years of cooperation, the creative tandem has implemented a number of major projects both in Russia and abroad. Among the most significant works of the studio are the monument to the Russian princess Olga Constantinovna Romanova in the Greek city of Thessaloniki (2016), the monument to the Hero of the Soviet Union Khanpasha Nuradilov in Grozny (2018), the monument to the Greek Legion of Emperor Nicholas I in Sevastopol (2016), the monument to the front-line dog on Poklonnaya Hill in Moscow (2013), the monument to metallurgists in Tula (2015), the monument to the pioneers of the Kursk Magnetic Anomaly in Gubkin, Belgorod Oblast (2012). Andrey Korobtsov is also a co-author of the monument to Pyotr Stolypin in Moscow.

In 2017, a monument to Ivan III was unveiled on the main square of Kaluga. The author of the idea was Andrei Konchalovsky, and Andrey Korobtsov embodied the image of the ruler in bronze.

The sculptor's completed projects include numerous memorial plaques to famous figures such as actor Yevgeny Vesnik, historian Sergei Vyazemsky, First Lady of Great Britain Spencer-Churchill and others.

A significant part of Korobtsov's easel art is a ballet series of works associated with the appearance of the prima ballerina of the Bolshoi Theatre Evgenia Obraztsova in the sculptor's life. In 2014, she became his wife and served as a prototype and model for most of the works in the cycle.

On April 1, 2018, a monumental bas-relief of the Russian composer Sergei Rachmaninoff was unveiled at the Philharmonic-2 concert complex.

In 2018, the project by Andrey Korobtsov and architect Konstantin Fomin won the competition for the design of the Rzhev Memorial to the Soviet Soldier. The opening of the memorial took place on June 30, 2020.

In 2020 he created an equestrian monument to Infantry General Pyotr Kotlyarevsky on the Feodosia embankment.

In 2021 he created a monument to Mikhail Devyataev in the village of Torbeevo, Mordovia. A monument to the defender of the Fatherland was unveiled in Chastoozerye, Kurgan Oblast. A bust of Vitaly Kopylov was unveiled in Komsomolsk-on-Amur. In honor of the 800th anniversary of Alexander Nevsky, the memorial "Prayer before the Battle" was opened in the Tosnensky District of the Leningrad Oblast.

In 2022 he created sculptures of the Dancer, Violinist, Trumpeter and Ballerina on the portico of the main facade of the Tchaikovsky Concert Hall.

In 2024 he created Memorial complex "To the peaceful citizens of the Soviet Union who died during the Great Patriotic War". It was opened on January 27, 2024, it is located in the village of Zaitsevo, Gatchina District, Leningrad Oblast. The authors of the monument are sculptor Andrei Korobtsov and architect Konstantin Fomin. In June 2024 he was awarded the State Prize of the Russian Federation.
