= Georgii Polozii =

Soviet mathematician

Georgii Nikolaevich Polozii
- Ukrainian: Георгій Миколайович Положій
- Born: April 23, 1914; Transbaikal, Russian Empire
- Died: November 26, 1968 (aged 54); Kiev, Kiev Oblast, Ukrainian Soviet Socialist Republic, Soviet Union
- Citizenship: Russian Empire → Soviet Union
- Education: Saratov State University
- Known for: theory of functions of a complex variable, approximation theory and numerical analysis
- Scientific career
- Fields: Mathematician
- Institutions: Taras Shevchenko National University of Kyiv

Georgii Nikolaevich Polozii (Ukrainian: Георгій Миколайович Положій; 23 April 1914 – 26 November 1968) was a Soviet mathematician who mostly worked in pure mathematics such as complex analysis, approximation theory and numerical analysis. He also worked on elasticity theory, which is used in applied math and physics. He was Corresponding Member of the Academy of Sciences of the Ukrainian SSR, Doctor of Physical and Mathematical Sciences (1953), Head of the Department of Computational Mathematics of the Kyiv Cybernetics Faculty University (1958).

== Education ==
In 1933, Polozii graduated from high school in the village of Verkhnyi Baskunchaky of Astrakhan Oblast, and subsequently entered the Faculty of Physics and Mathematics of Saratov University.

He graduated from Saratov University in 1937 and stayed to teach until he moved to the University of Kiev in 1949.

== Later life ==
After 1938, Polozii worked at the Department of Mathematical Analysis.

He participated in the Soviet-Finnish war. During the German-Soviet war in one of the battles near Nelidovo as infantry platoon commander he was seriously wounded. He had seven operations then he returned to Saratov University where he was engaged in scientific and pedagogical work. In 1946 he defended his Ph.D. thesis "Integral images of continuously differentiable functions of a complex variable".

In 1949, he began working at the University of Kyiv, first as an associate professor of the Department of Mathematical Physics, and from 1951 to 1958 – its head. In 1953 he defended his doctoral dissertation on the topic "On some methods of the theory of functions in the mechanics of a continuous medium". In 1958 Georgiy Polozhia was elected head of the Department of Computational Mathematics.

He died on September 26, 1968, less than a year before realizing his dream of creating a separate faculty for computational mathematics and cybernetics. He is buried in Kyiv at Baykovoye Cemetery.

== Works ==
Polozii mostly worked in the following four areas.

=== Complex functions ===
He produced "original results in the theory of functions of a complex variable"

A complex function is a function whose domain and range are subsets of the complex plane. For any complex function, the values $z$ from the domain and their images $f(z)$ in the range may be separated into real and imaginary parts:

$$z=x+iy \quad \text{ and } \quad f(z) = f(x+iy)=u(x,y)+iv(x,y),$$

where $x,y,u(x,y),v(x,y)$ are all real-valued.

In other words, a complex function $f:\mathbb{C}\to\mathbb{C}$ may be decomposed into

$$u:\mathbb{R}^2\to\mathbb{R} \quad \text{ and } \quad v:\mathbb{R}^2\to\mathbb{R},$$

i.e., into two real-valued functions ($u$, $v$) of two real variables ($x,y$).

The basic concepts of complex analysis are often introduced by extending the elementary real functions (e.g., exponential functions, logarithmic functions, and trigonometric functions) into a complex domain and the corresponding complex range.

=== Approximation theory ===
He developed methods to solve boundary value problems which arise in mathematical physics. His work produced the method of summary representation. He "devised a new approximation method for the solution of problems in elasticity and filtration".

Approximation theory tries to develop simpler functions to mimic or get close to more complex ones and define the errors that can be introduced by these approximations.

=== Numerical analysis ===
Polozii came up with a new class of (p,q) analytic functions and developed a new notion of p-analytic functions, defined the notion of derivative and integral for these functions, developed their calculus and obtained a generalised Cauchy's formula".
