= Alexander Akopov =

Russian painter (b. 1970)

Alexander Akopov Александр Акопов
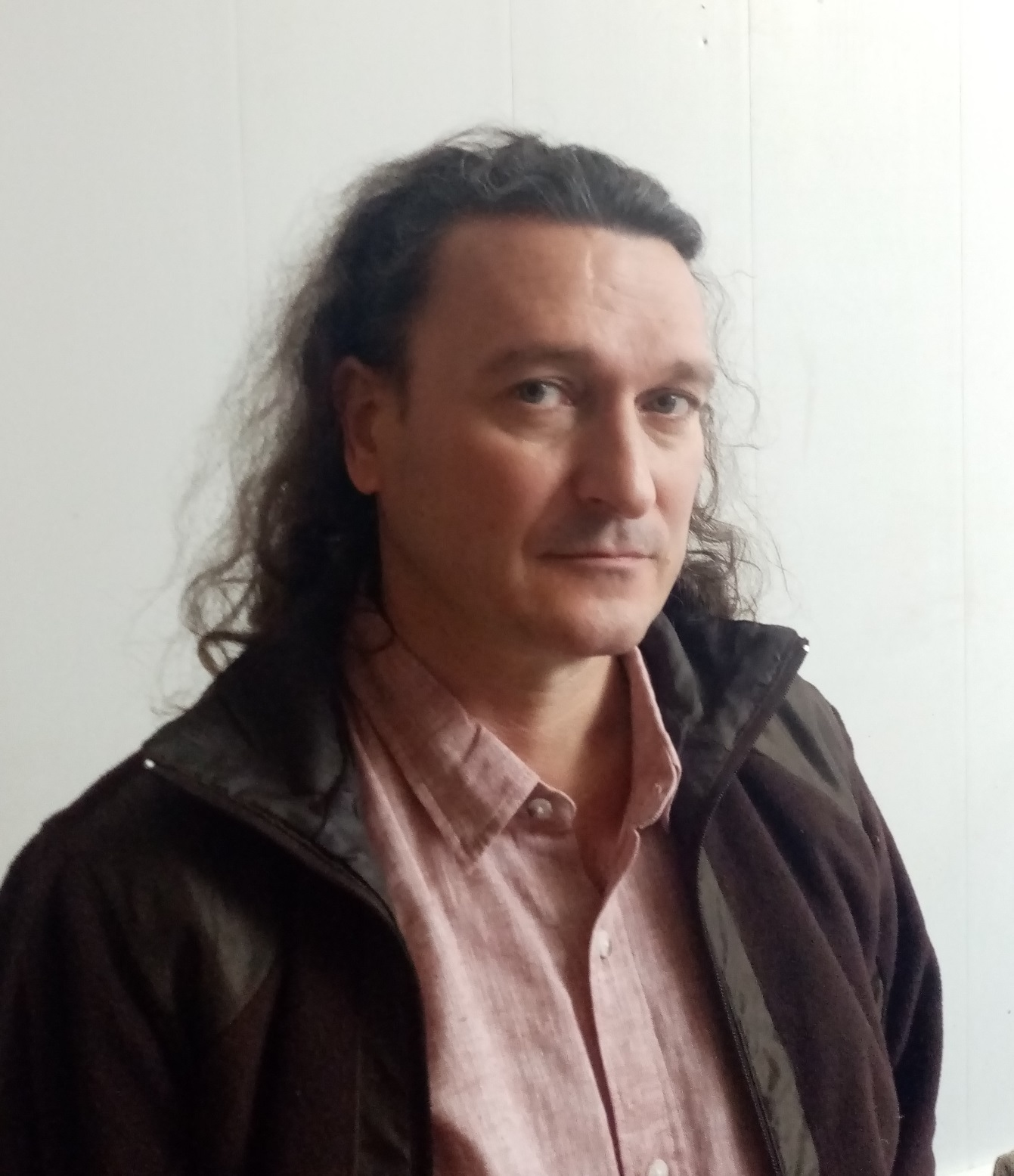
- Born: August 18, 1970; Moscow
- Citizenship: Russia
- Education: Moscow Academic Art Lyceum of the Russian Academy of Arts; Russian Academy of Painting, Sculpture and Architecture
- Occupation: Artist
- Style: Realism
- Website: akopovart.com

Alexander Dmitrievich Akopov (Russian: Александр Дмитриевич Акопов; born 18 August 1970) is a Russian painter, member of the Creative Union of Artists of Russia (TSHR), member of the International Federation of Artists of Unesco.

== Biography ==
Alexander Akopov was born in Moscow. He studied at the Moscow Tomsk Secondary Art School at the Surikov Institute (MSKhS) from 1981 to 1988. In 1996, he graduated from the Russian Academy of Painting, Sculpture and Architecture in the field of easel painting, graphics and monumental art.

Since 1987 he has participated in many exhibitions. In 1999, he founded and became the general director (until 2002) of the art gallery and association of artists "Kitovras", which constantly worked in the Central House of Artists on Krymsky Val until 2016. In this gallery, exhibitions of the members of the partnership were held annually, the exposition changed every 3 months. Collaborated with the Soyuz Tvorchestvo gallery. Participated in major international exhibitions: 1987 Central House of Artists "Theater begins with an artist" , 1998 "CHA-98 Moscow International Salon". Exhibited his works in galleries in Germany, Austria, USA, Great Britain and China. Alexander Akopov in 2013 at the Central House of Artists participated in the exhibition "Sliding Light IV".

In 2010, the artist participated in the reconstruction of the wooden palace of Alexey Mikhailovich with Eugene. Kravtsov (ceiling painting) and with Ivan Glazunov (interiors). 2014-2015 teacher of painting at the Moscow Academic Art School in memory of 1905.

From December 2019 to January 15, 2020, Alexander Akopov, V. Khudyakov and Ya. Zyablov in the People's Republic of China, at the official invitation of the Chinese government, painted two paintings 16.3x6.5 m and 8.5x5.5 m. One shows the spillway of the dam on the Huang He River, the second shows the Song Shan Mountains with the Shaolin Monastery and other attractions. The project was supervised by the governor of Henan Province and the chairman of the Union of Artists of China. Alexander Akopov works in the genre of landscape, still life, portrait, fresco paintings. Among the works created by him are the paintings "Portrait of Raisa Gorbacheva", "On the Agora", "Ararat", "Greek", "Wind from the Sea" and others.

In Kazan, Alexander Akopov together with Evgeny Kravtsov frescoes were executed in the recreated Cathedral of the Kazan Icon of the Mother of God.

In 2013, the artist wrote a series of humorous illustrations "About tandem", which was reflected in numerous responses in the press.

The works of Alexander Akopov are in the collections of a number of famous museums and in private collections, among them the museum Russian Academy of Painting, Sculpture and Architecture, in private collections in Russia, Ukraine, France, England and United States. A number of television programs and articles in Russian and foreign publications are devoted to the work of Alexander Akopov — the painter. Unfortunately, the artist has imitators who write and sell paintings on the subject of ballet under his name, a genre in which the artist has never worked.

== Gallery ==
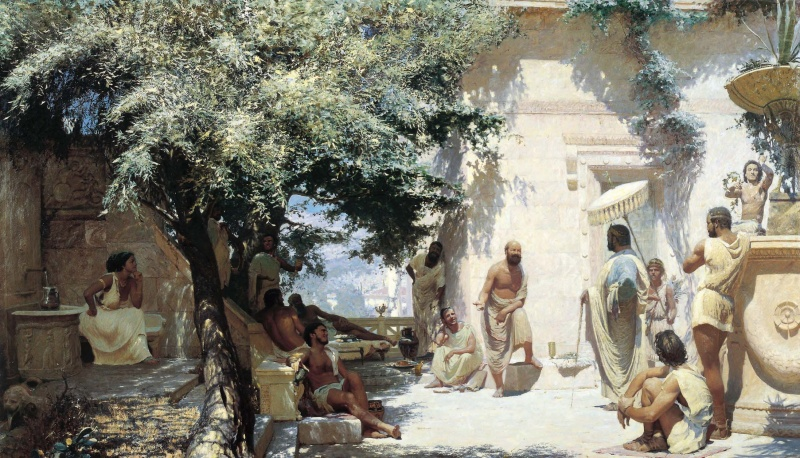
On the Agora

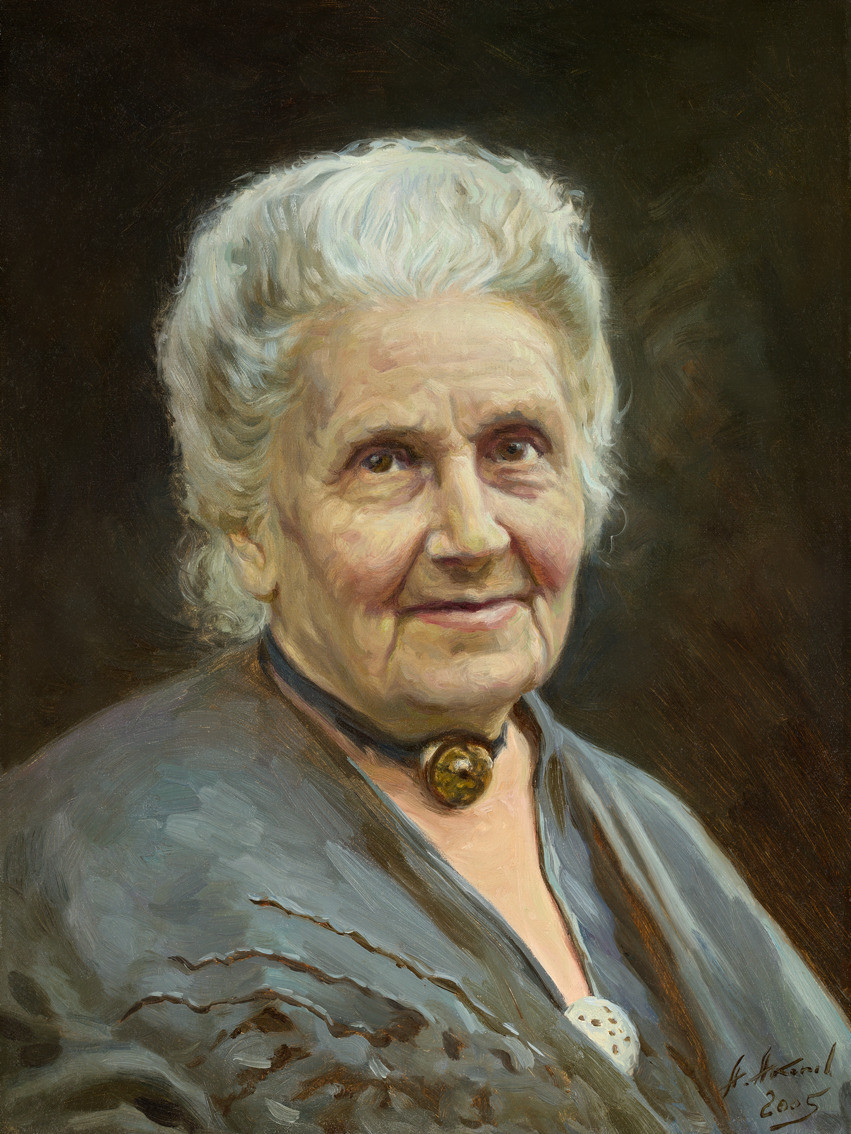
Montessori

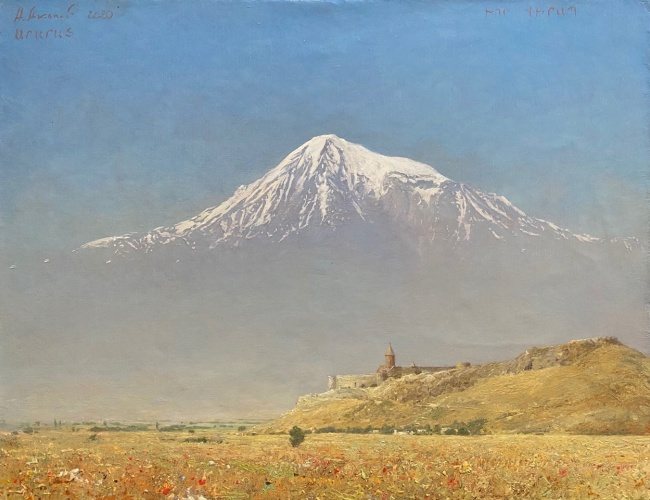
Ararat

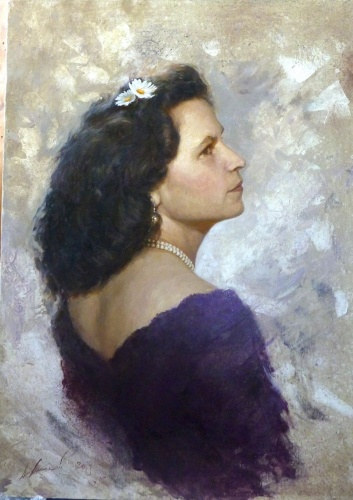
Galina Yakovlevna

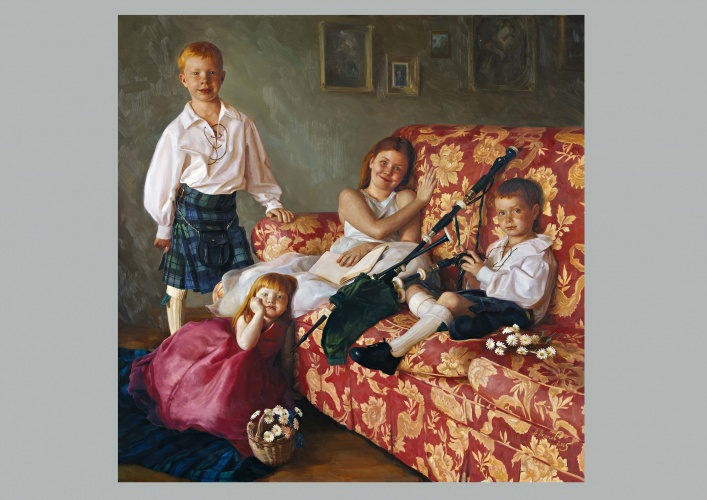
Children Campbell

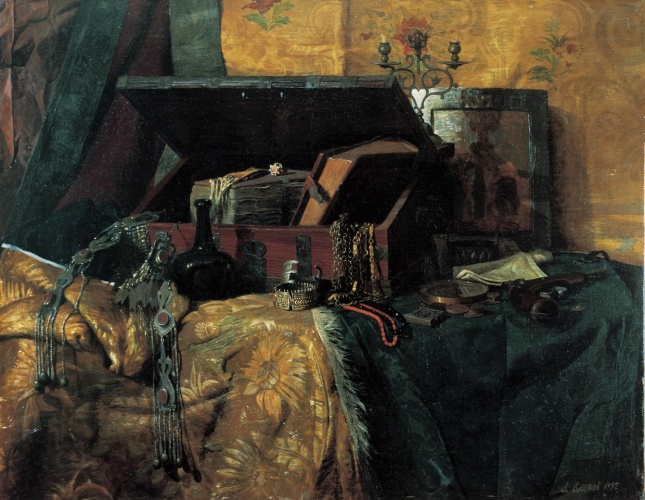
Merchant's still life

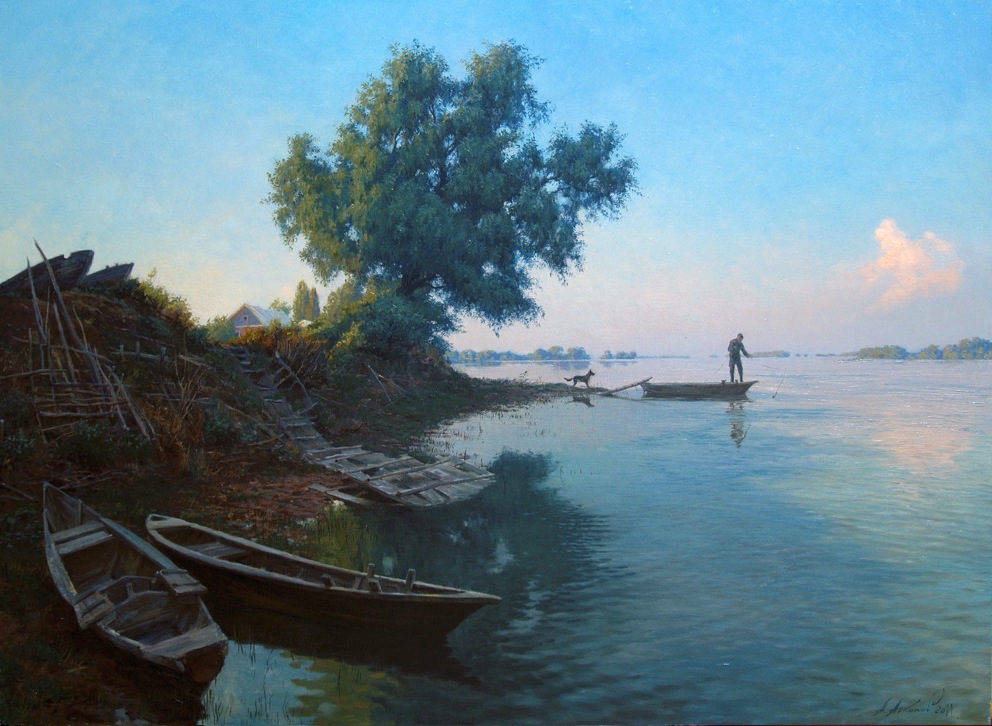
Big water. Lower Volga river

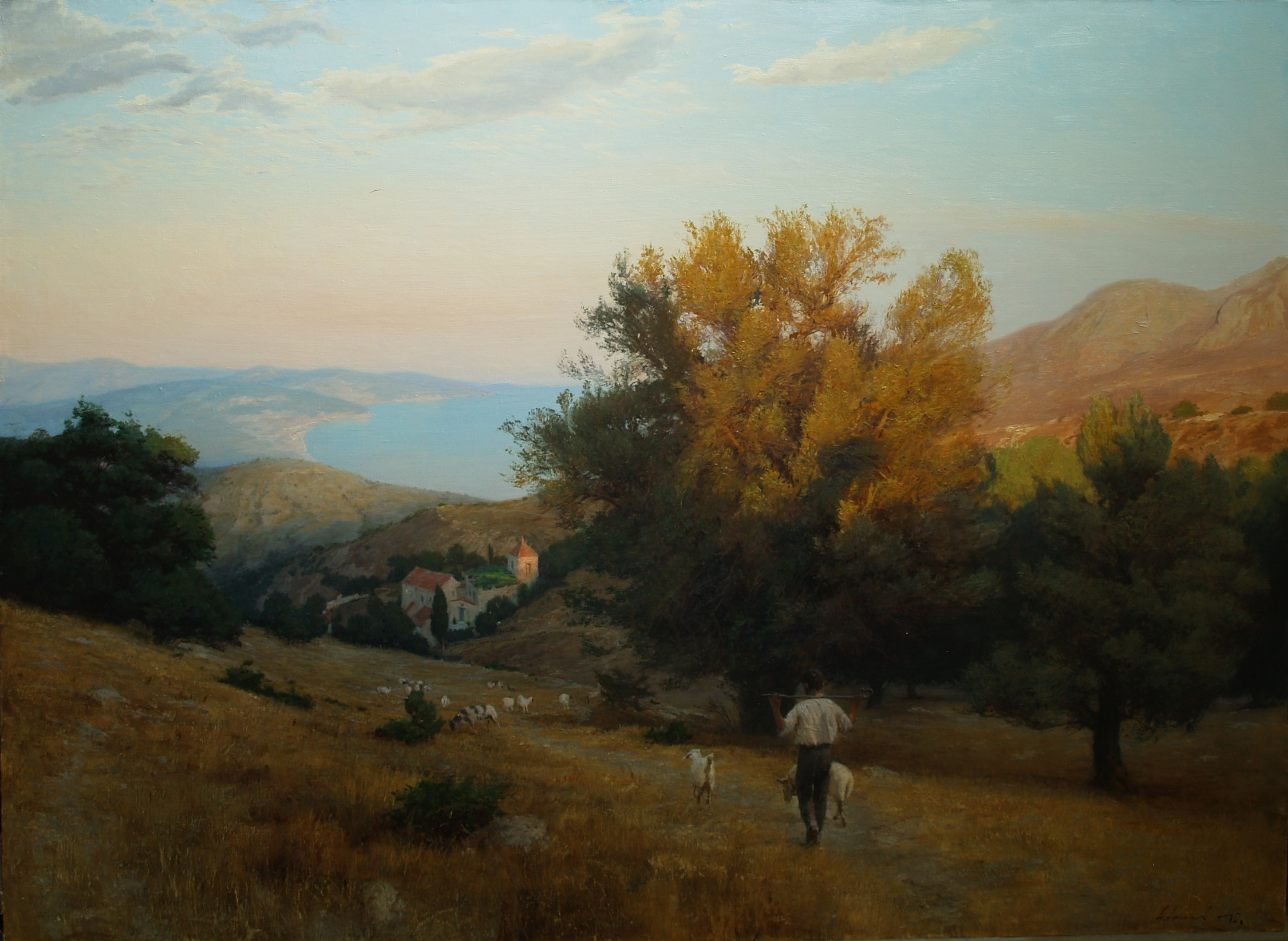
In Crete

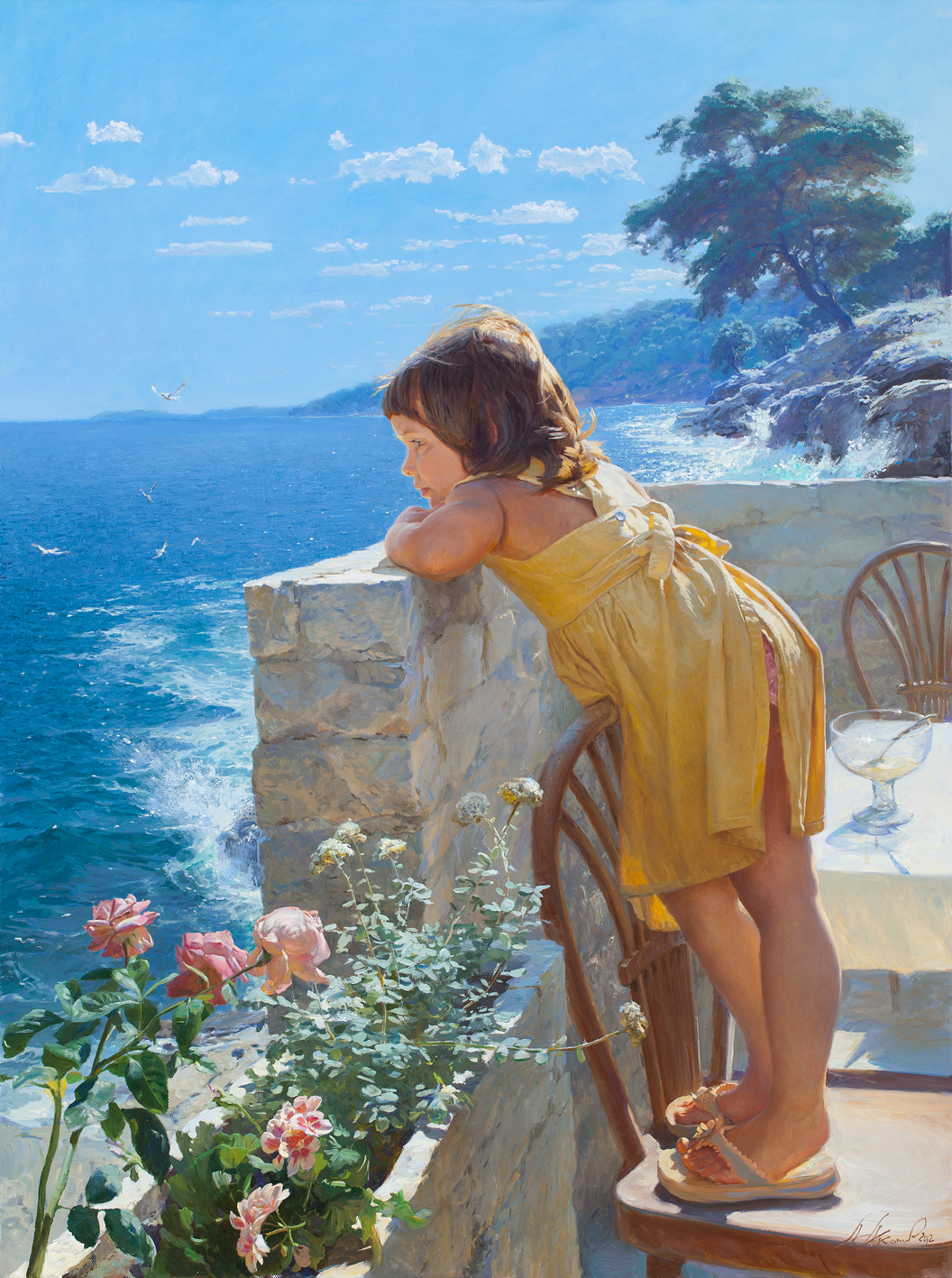
Natalia

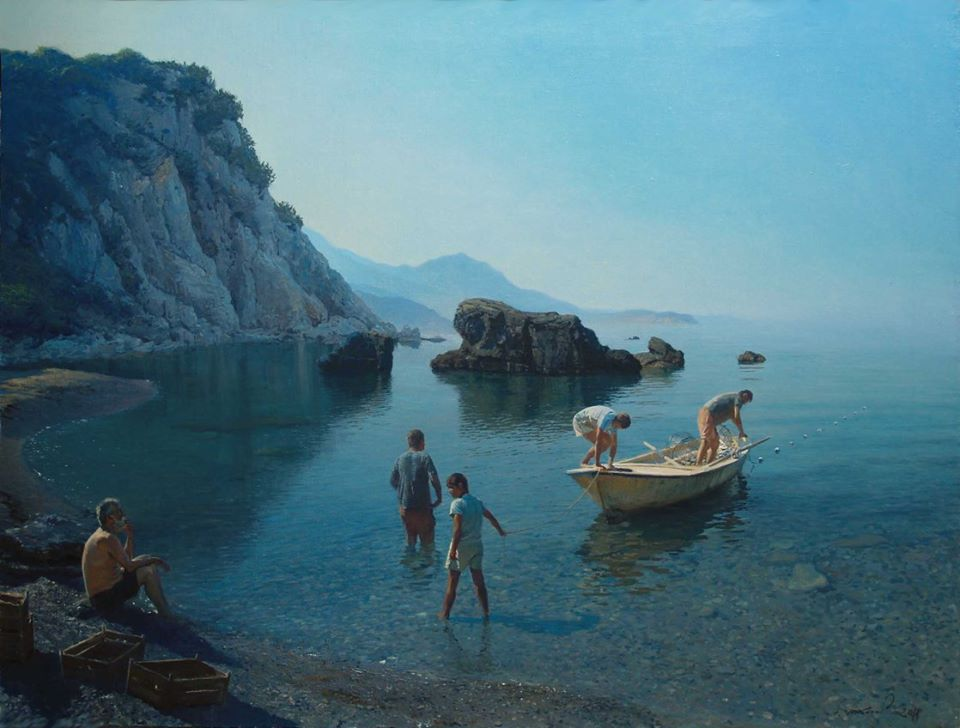
Morning

== Exhibitions ==
- 1987 "Theater begins with the artist" Central House of Artists
- 1998 "Central House of Artists-98 Moscow International Salon" Central House of Artists
- 1999-2016 annual exhibitions in his own gallery "Kitavras"
- 2000-2020 solo exhibitions in galleries in Germany, Austria, the United States, Great Britain and China.
