= Evgenia Obraztsova =

Russian ballerina (born 1984)

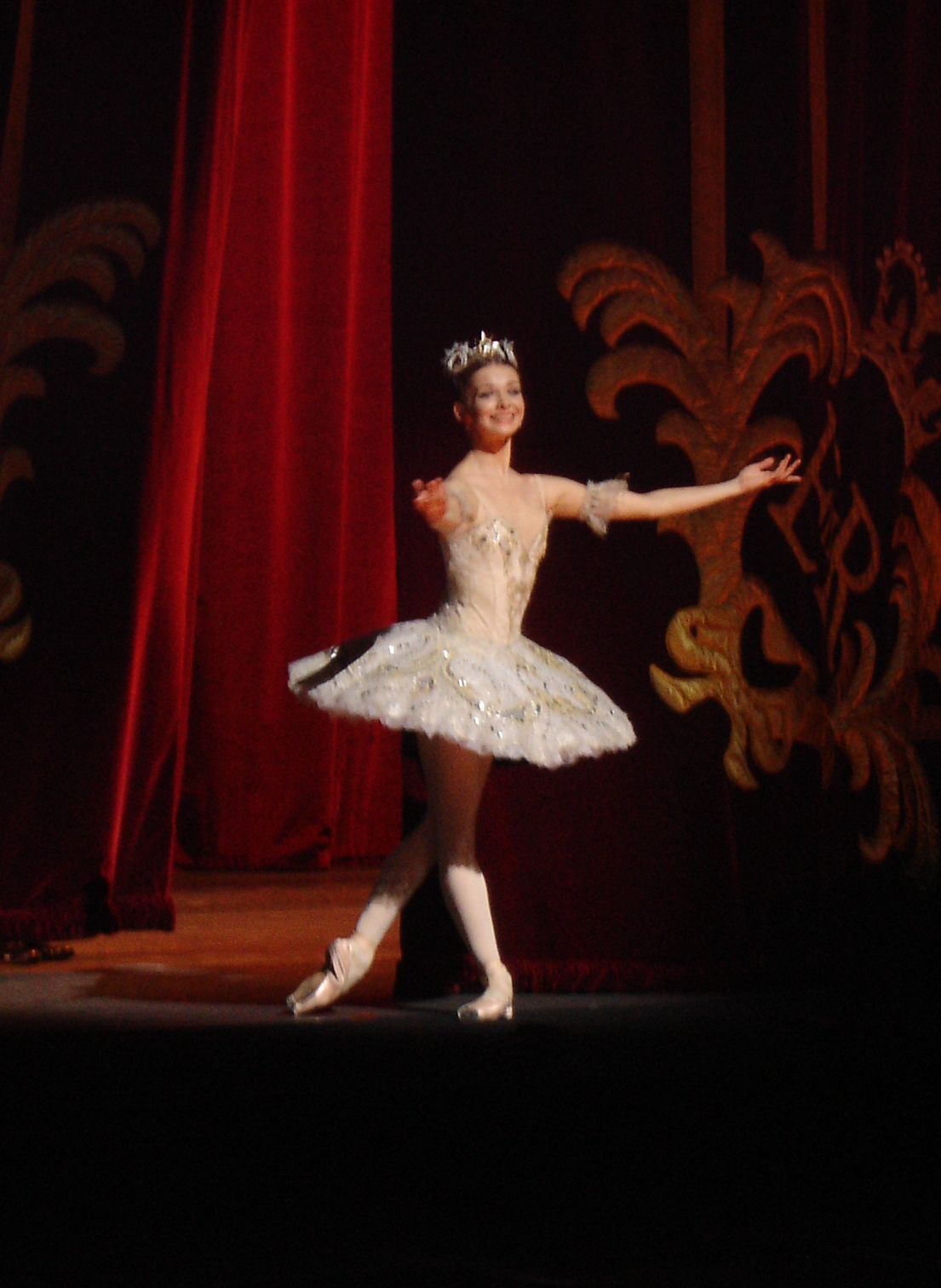
- Obraztsova at the Royal Opera House in Covent Garden in 2009
- Born: 18 January 1984 (age 42); Leningrad, Soviet Union
- Education: Vaganova School
- Occupation: Ballerina
- Spouse: Andrei Korobtsov
- Dancing career
- Current group: Bolshoi Theatre

Evgenia Viktorovna Obraztsova (Russian: Евге́ния Ви́кторовна Образцо́ва; born 18 January 1984) is a Russian ballerina. She is a prima ballerina with the Bolshoi Ballet in Moscow, and with the Mariinsky Ballet.

== Early life ==
Evgenia Obraztsova was born into a family of dancers, as her mother studied under Natalia Dudinskaya and was a member of the company at the Moussorgski Theatre. Obraztsova discovered her dance talents early and passed the entrance exams for the Vaganova School, which trains young dancers in preparation for joining the Mariinsky troupe.

== Mariinsky ballet ==
Evgenia Obraztsova graduated from the Vaganova Academy in 2002, having studied with Marina Vasilieva, before joining the Mariinsky company and rapidly proceeding through the ranks, protected and guided by a previous ballet star, the renowned Ninel Kurgapkina. Obraztsova soon learned by reading one of the theater brochures that she had been promoted from "Corps de ballet" to "Coryphée" (demi-soloist) - no one at the theater had informed her of her promotion.

In 2003, Obraztsova became the youngest dancer in the history of the Mariinsky to interpret the role of Juliet and it became one of her favorite roles.

During the 2005/2006 season, Obraztsova continued to advance, and was offered opportunities to dance in three ballets created for her. In November 2005, Carla Fracci, director of the ballet of the Rome Opera, invited Obraztsova to perform in Prokofiev's Cinderella. In March 2006, French choreographer Pierre Lacotte chose Obraztsova for the title role in his new version of the romantic ballet Ondine. Obraztsova's performance as Ondine would win her the prestigious Golden Mask award. Two months later, Obraztsova would return to Rome to dance in Faust by Luciano Cannito.

Inspired by artists such as Diana Vishneva, Ulyana Lopatkina, and Aurélie Dupont, Obrastzova was lauded for creating genuine interpretations, sensitive and intelligent for the key roles. She was particularly acclaimed for her work in Romeo and Juliet.

== Principal dancer with the Bolshoi Ballet ==
Evgenia Obraztsova was promoted to principal dancer with the Bolshoi Ballet in February 2012. Her ballet master-repetiteur is Nadezhda Gracheva.

In 2016 Evgenia was awarded the title of Merited Artist of the Russian Federation.

In 2017 Evgenia was the first one to perform the role of Juliet in the new production of Romeo and Juliet staged by Alexei Ratmansky. In 2019, Christopher Wheeldon premiered The Winter's Tale at the Bolshoi theatre starring Evgenia as the queen Hermione. For this role she is nominated for the Golden Mask award.

In March 2020 Evgenia debuted as Phrygia in Spartacus ballet.

Evgenia Obraztsova is currently performing some of the key roles at the Bolshoi theatre.

== On stage ==
Evgenia Obraztsova is frequently invited as a guest soloist to other countries, and is known for dancing leading roles in ballets such as Romeo and Juliet, Ondine, Giselle, and La Sylphide. She has won several awards, including the Gold Medal at the Moscow International Ballet Competition in 2005.

In high demand, she was again asked to dance the leading role in Vikharev Sergei's The Awakening of Flora in 2007. She also participates in numerous tours with the company, whether in Japan, the United States, France, Austria or Israel, as well as several international galas. In 2008 she took the lead role in Shurale, a ballet by Leonid Jakobson. In November 2009, Obraztsova was also invited to the Royal Ballet, dancing as Aurora in their production of The Sleeping Beauty, partnered with David Makhateli. She then danced at the Rome Opera, in Giselle in February 2010.

After Ondine, she rejoined Pierre Lacotte in the summer of 2010, replacing Isabelle Ciaravola for the role of Constance Bonacieux in "The Three Musketeers", a newly choreographed production, along with dancers such as Mathias Heymann, Mathieu Ganio, Dorothée Gilbert, and Marie-Agnès Gillot. A few months later, she danced again with Mathieu Ganio, and both were invited by the Stanislavsky Theater to dance "Giselle" in Moscow.

== Film acting career ==
In 2005, she took a role as an actress in Cédric Klapisch's The Russian Dolls, where she played Natasha. It was a role very close to her actual life, as Natasha was a young ballerina in the Mariinsky Theater. She never had to audition for the film, and was just noted by chance by Klapisch when he was visiting the Mariinsky. Obraztsova was also profiled in the 2006 documentary Ballerina. by Bertrand Normand, which explored the artistic life of dancers such as Ulyana Lopatkina, Svetlana Zakharova, and Diana Vishneva.

In 2018, she performed the main female role in the movie A Frenchman (2019) by Andrei Smirnov. For her role Evgenia is nominated for Nika Award - the main annual national film award in Russia presented by the Russian Academy of Cinema Arts and Science.

== Recognition ==
In 2006, she was named one of "25 to Watch" by Dance Magazine.

== Personal life ==
Evgenia Obraztsova married sculptor Andrei Korobtsov on 27 April 2014. They have twin daughters, Sofia and Anastasia, born July 25, 2016.

== Awards ==
- 2002 : Médaille d'or du Prix Vaganova of Saint Petersburg
- 2005 : Gold medal at the Moscow International Ballet Competition
- 2005 : Zegna Mariinsky New Talents Award in Paris
- 2006 : Prix Léonide Massine in Italy
- 2007 : Golden Mask Award for best dancer for Ondine by Pierre Lacotte
- 2008 : Nina Ananiashvili Star Award (Tbilisi)
- 2009 : Principal Dancer Prize, Esprit de la Danse
- 2012 : International Dance Open Award in “Miss Virtuosity” nomination
- 2016 : Merited Artist of the Russian Federation
- 2018 : La Renaissance française golden medal for her contribution in promotion of French culture in Russia

== Repertoire ==
- Ondine: Ondine
- Romeo and Juliet: Juliet
- Le Corsaire: trio of Odalisques
- Apollon musagète: Terpsichore
- Sleeping Beauty: Princess Aurora
- Le Bourgeois gentilhomme: Nicole
- Don Quixote: Kitri
- Carnival of Venice: Colombine
- Shurale: Siyumbike
- The Fountain of Bakhchisarai: Marie
- La Sylphide: the Sylphide
- La Légende de l'amour: Chirine
- Cendrillon: Cendrillon
- Le Réveil de Flore: Flore
- Nutcracker: Masha
- Swan Lake: cygnet, Odette/Odile
- Faust : Margherita
- Giselle: Giselle
- Le Petit cheval bossu: the Tsar-Demoiselle
- Petrouchka: the Ballerina
- Three Musketeers: Constance
- Marco Spada: Angela (The Bandit's Daughter)
- Illusions perdues: Coralie
- The Pharaoh's Daughter: Aspicia
- Anyuta: Anyuta
- La Bayadère: Nikia
- Onegin: Tatiana
- Coppélia: Swanhilda
- Paquita: Paquita
- The Lady of the Camellias: Marguerite Gautier
- Flames of Paris: Jeanne
- The Winter's Tale: Hermione
- Gaîté Parisienne
- Symphony in C
- Spartacus: Phrygia

== Filmography ==
- Don Quixote, with Olesia Novikova, Leonid Sarafanov, Alina Somova and other dancers from the Mariinsky Theatre
- Swan Lake, with Ulyana Lopatkina, Danila Korsuntev, Olesia Novikova and the Mariinsky dancers
- Marco Spada, with David Hallberg, Olga Smirnova, Semyon Chudin, and other dancers from the Bolshoi Ballet
- L'auberge espagnol - Wiedersehen in Sankt Petersburg, 2005
- The Russian Dolls by Cédric Klapisch
- Bertrand Normand (writer/director) (2005). Ballerina (television documentary) (in French, Russian, and English). France: Adesif Productions.
- A Frenchman (2019) as Kira Galkina, ballet dancer of the Bolshoi Theater

== See also ==
- List of Russian ballet dancers
