= Rzhev Memorial to the Soviet Soldier =

War Memorial

Coordinates: 56.2185°N 34.2626°E

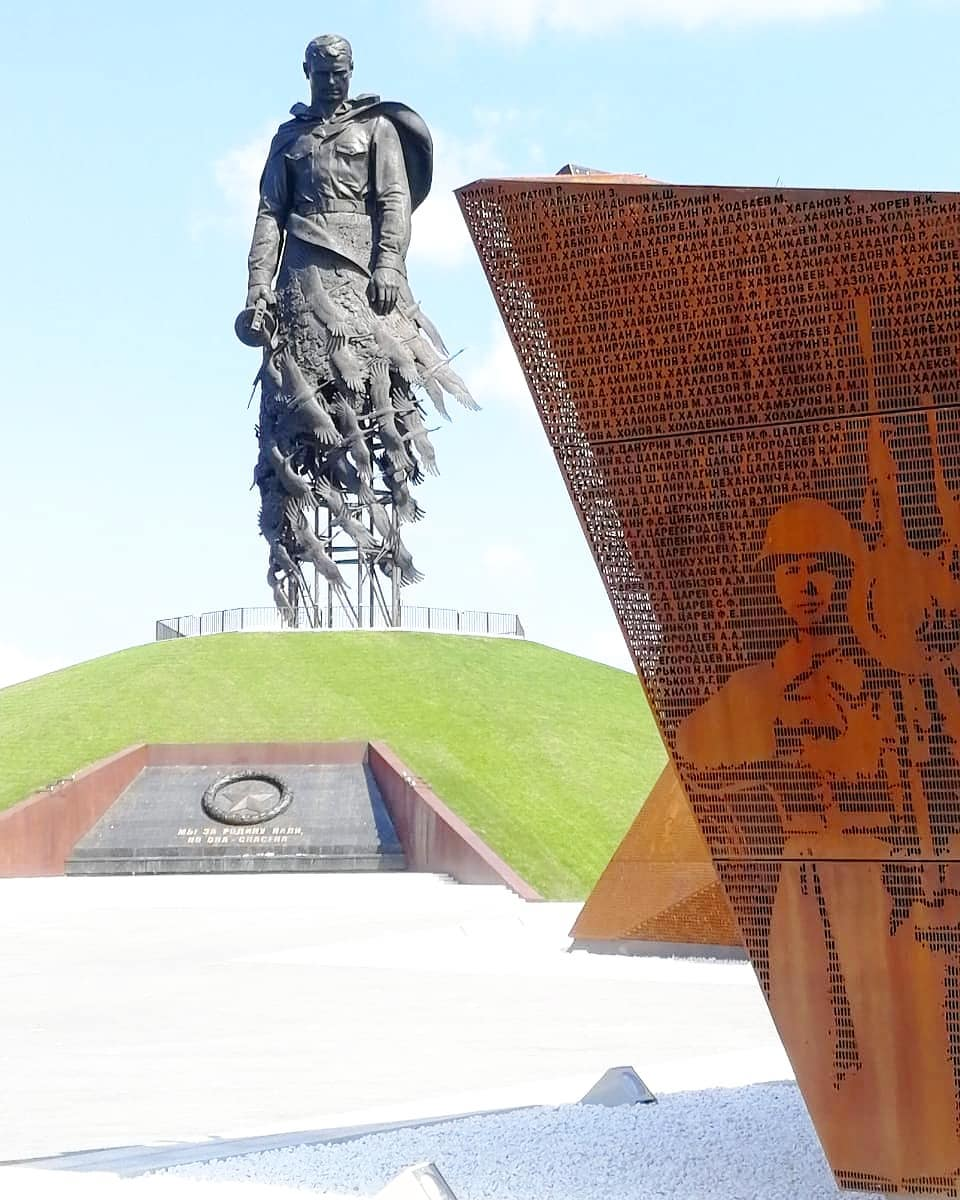
The monument

The Rzhev Memorial to the Soviet Soldier (Russian: Ржевский мемориал Советскому солдату) is a Russian memorial park located in the Rzhevsky District of the Tver Oblast. The park is dedicated to the Battles of Rzhev.

== Overview ==
=== History ===
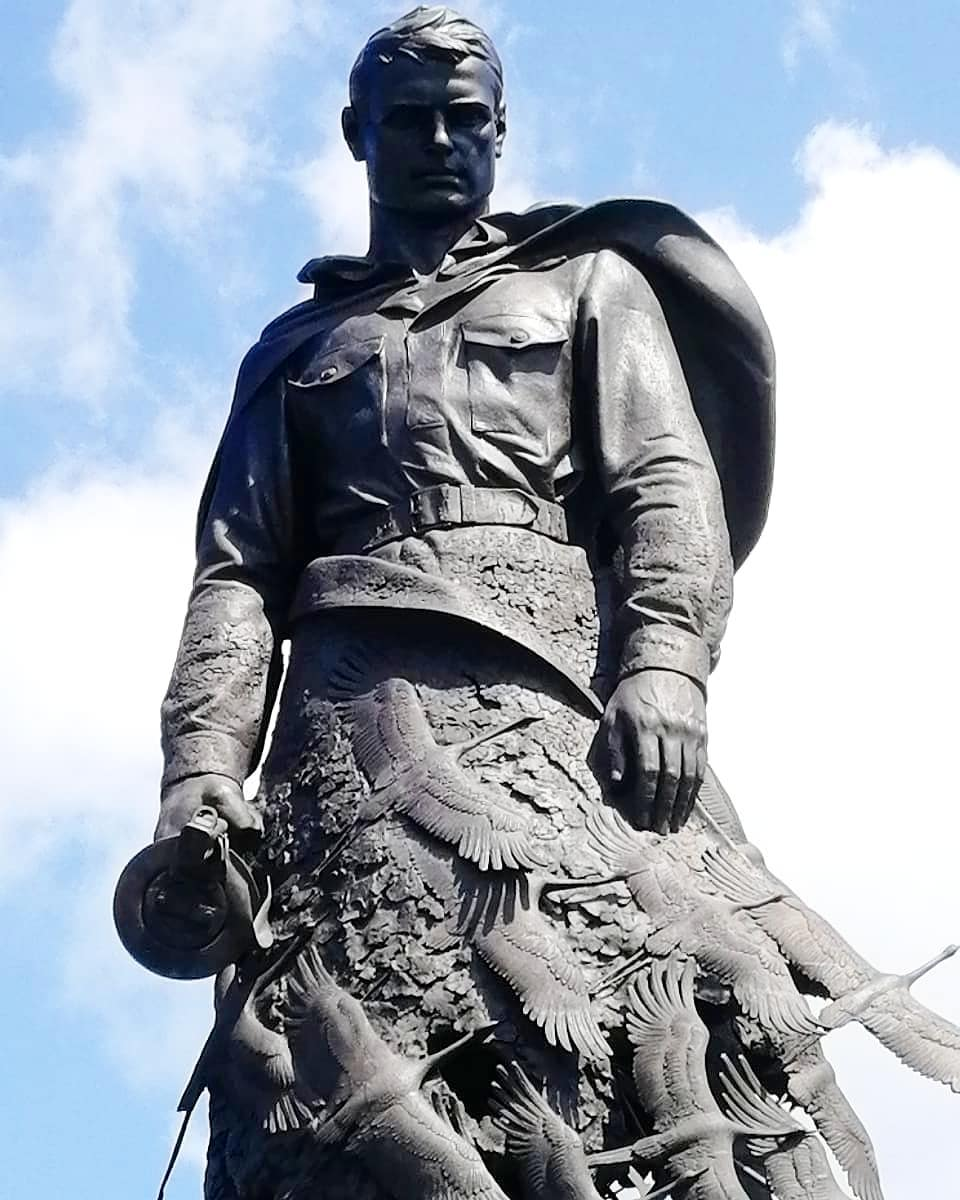
Soldier

The idea to build the memorial came from veterans of the war who collectively wrote to the Committee of the Union State of Russia and Belarus and to scouts of the Russian Military Historical Society (RMHS) in 2017 asking them to create a monument in honor of the diamond jubilee of the victory. Andrei Korobtsov and Konstantin Fomin were the respective sculptor and architect for the project, both being chosen following an international competition that looked into the matter. The erection of the monument began in January 2020 and was completed by early May. Despite being completed in time for the anniversary celebrations on 9 May, it was decided, in light of the COVID-19 pandemic, that the opening date would be pushed a month later. It was opened in a public ceremony on 30 June attended by Russian president Vladimir Putin, Belarusian president Alexander Lukashenko and Red Army veterans of the Second World War.

=== Monument ===
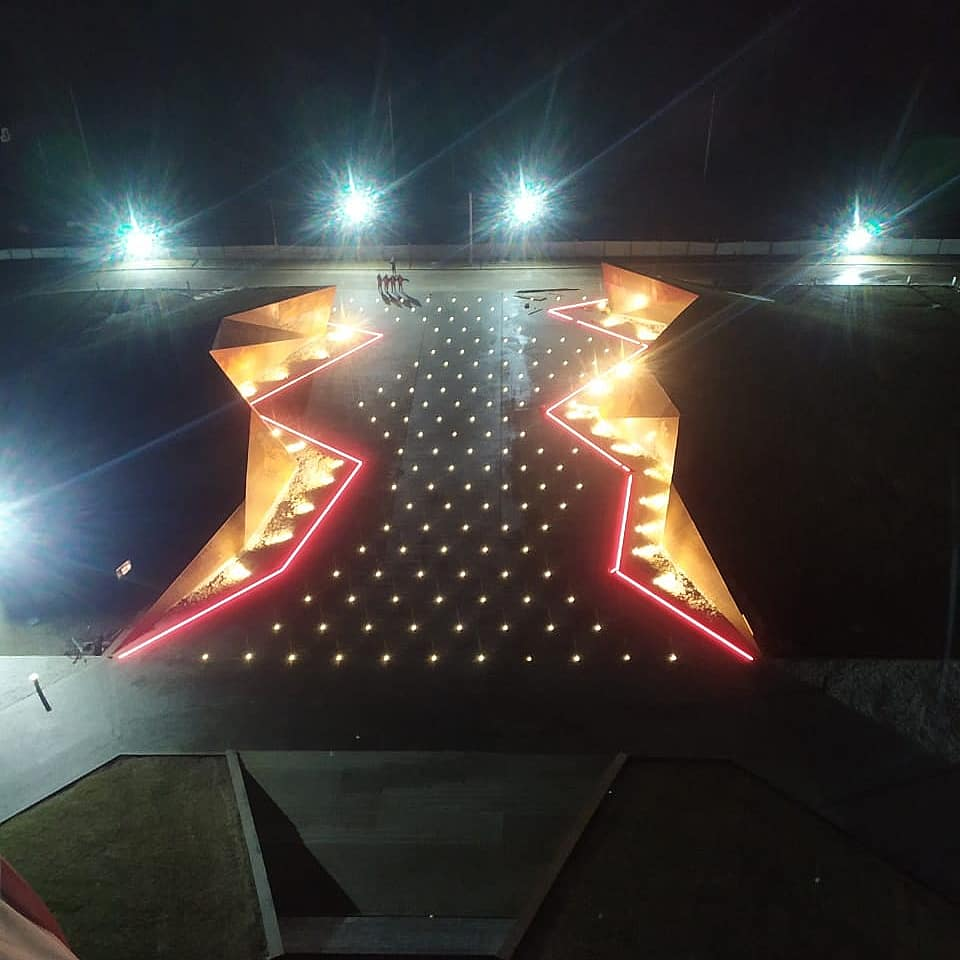
The memorial at night.

The monument features a bronze 25-metre statue of a soldier in the Red Army standing on a 10-metre mound. On the road leading to the mound, there are images of soldiers on broken walls situated on both sides, as well as the names of those who were killed in action during the battle. Around 34 million rubles were allocated to the monument from the regional government, alongside the 650 million rubles allocated by the Union States, the budget of the Russian government, and private donations. The construction of the monument was also financed and supported by organizations such as Lukoil. The image of a soldier dissolving in a flock of cranes originates from the poem Zhuravli by Rasul Gamzatov, which became iconic thanks to its adaptation to music by Yan Frenkel.

"I sometimes feel that the soldiers
Who have not returned from the bloody fields
Never lay down to earth
But turned into white cranes..."
