= Ballerina (2006 film) =

- Directed by: Bertrand Normand
- Starring: Diana Vishneva; Svetlana Zakharova; Ulyana Lopatkina; Alina Somova; Evgenia Obraztsova

Production
- Producers: Frédéric Podetti; Yann Brolli
- Editor: Antonela Bevenja
- Running time: 80 minutes

Original release
- Release: 2006

Ballerina is a 2006 documentary film that follows the training sessions, rehearsals, and everyday lives of five Russian ballerinas at different stages in their career. The film features footage of classes at the Vaganova Ballet Academy as well as performances in the Mariinsky Theatre.
