= A Frenchman =

- Russian: Француз
- Directed by: Andrey Smirnov
- Written by: Andrey Smirnov
- Produced by: Elena Prudnikova; Andrey Smirnov; Valery Todorovsky
- Starring: Anton Rival; Evgenia Obraztsova; Evgeniy Tkachuk; Aleksandr Baluev; Mikhail Efremov; Roman Madyanov
- Cinematography: Yuriy Shaygardanov
- Edited by: Anna Krutiy
- Music by: Dmitry Shostakovich
- Production company: Marmot Film
- Release date: June 16, 2019 (Open Russian Film Festival Kinotavr)
- Running time: 128 minutes
- Country: Russia
- Language: Russian

A Frenchman (Russian: Француз, romanized: Frantsuz) is a 2019 Russian black-and-white historical drama film directed, written, and co-produced by Andrey Smirnov.

The film takes place in 1957. It tells about the French student Pierre Durand, who goes to Moscow for an internship, where he gets acquainted with the Bolshoi Theatre ballerina and photographer, thanks to whom he immerses himself in the cultural life of Moscow.

== Plot ==
In August 1957, three young left-wing Parisians — Nicole, Jean-Marie, and Pierre — meet for the last time at a café on the banks of the Seine. Jean-Marie is departing to serve in the Algerian War, while Pierre, a student of Russian descent, travels to the Soviet Union for an academic internship.

Upon his arrival in Moscow, Pierre Durand takes up residence in the dormitories of Moscow State University (MGU). He studies Russian literature and conducts research for his thesis on the work of French ballet master Marius Petipa. During his stay, he befriends Valery Uspensky, a photography student at VGIK (the All-Russian State Institute of Cinematography). Valery introduces Pierre to Kira Galkina, a ballerina at the Bolshoi Theatre. Due to the relative cultural openness of the Khrushchev Thaw, Pierre — a Frenchman fluent in Russian — is received with curiosity and interest by Muscovites. Through his new acquaintances, Pierre becomes immersed not only in the official Soviet culture but also in its unofficial, underground life.

As Pierre becomes closer to Kira, he develops romantic feelings for her, leading to subtle rivalry with his friend Valery.

Parallel to his academic pursuits, Pierre is on a personal quest to find his biological father — a former White Army officer named Tatishchev. In 1931, Pierre’s mother, a descendant of an old Russian noble family, had a brief affair with Tatishchev, resulting in her pregnancy. Concealing the pregnancy, she took a post at the Soviet trade mission in Berlin, from which she eventually escaped and emigrated to Paris.

With the help of former Smolny Institute alumni who had spent years in the Gulag, Pierre eventually locates Tatishchev, who is now working as a night watchman in a provincial town. It is revealed that, following the evacuation of White forces to Constantinople, Tatishchev remained in the RSFSR. He somehow survived the Red Terror in Crimea and lived freely into the early 1930s, even enjoying holidays at the seaside. His occupation prior to his first arrest remains unclear. Tatishchev was imprisoned multiple times throughout the 1930s and 1940s but ultimately survived the Gulag system.

When Pierre and Tatishchev finally meet, the aging officer expresses astonishment that his son has become a communist, seeing it as a bitter irony. Tatishchev confides in Pierre a personal revelation: as a talented mathematician, he claims to have mathematically proven the existence of God. Not long after their meeting, Tatishchev passes away.

Pierre returns to Moscow, only to learn that Valery has been arrested. Soon afterward, he departs for Paris.

== Cast ==
- Anton Rival as Pierre Durand, French student
- Evgenia Obraztsova as Kira Galkina, ballerina of the Bolshoi Theater
- Evgeniy Tkachuk as Valery "Valera" Uspensky, photographer
- Aleksandr Baluev as Tatishchev
- Mikhail Efremov as Valery Uspensky's dad
- Roman Madyanov as Chuhnovsky
- Nina Drobysheva as Olga Obrezkova
- Natalya Tenyakova as Maria Obrezkova
- Thomas Alden as Louis
- Anna Neverova as Marusya
- Alexander Zamuraev as Alcoholic
- Manuel Sinor as Restaurateur

== Production ==
The film was written and directed by Andrey Smirnov, and co-produced by Elena Prudnikova, Smirnov, and ValeryTodorovsky.

== Awards ==
A Frenchman won the Nika Award for Best Feature Film and Best Director, along with other awards.
