= Ilya Glazunov =

Russian painter (1930–2017)

- Илья Глазунов
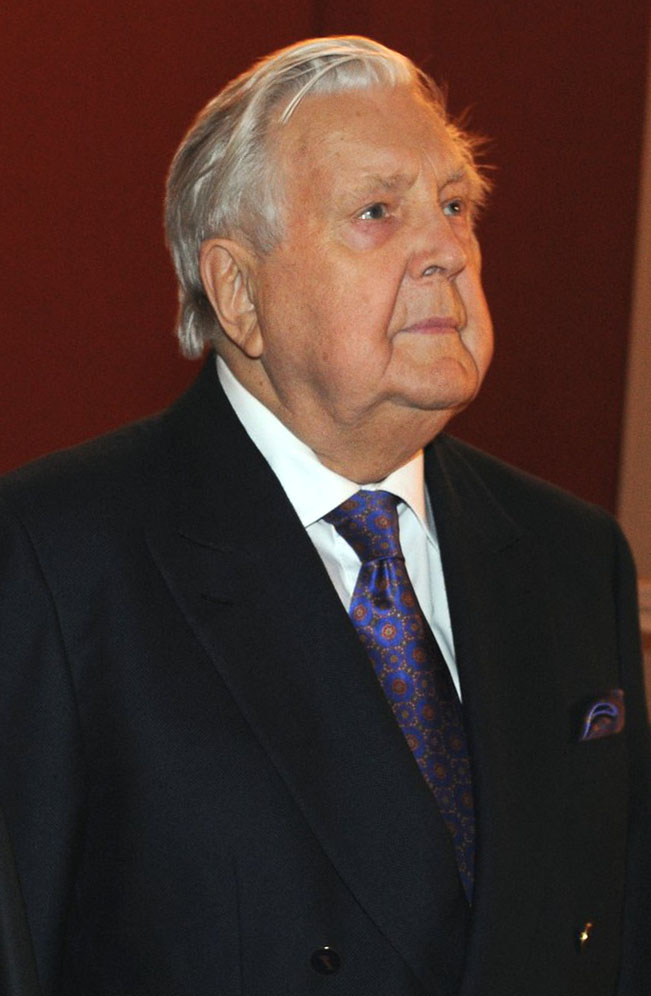
- Glazunov in 2015
- Born: 10 June 1930; Leningrad, Russian SFSR, Soviet Union
- Died: 9 July 2017 (aged 87); Moscow, Russia
- Education: Leningrad Secondary Art School
- Known for: Painting
- Awards: Full cavalier of the Order "For Merit to the Fatherland"

Ilya Sergeyevich Glazunov (Russian: Илья Сергеевич Глазунов; 10 June 1930 – 9 July 2017) was a Soviet and Russian artist from Saint Petersburg. He was the founder of the Russian Academy of Painting, Sculpture and Architecture where he also served as a rector up until his death. He held the title of People's Artist of the RSFSR.

Ilya Glazunov's paintings primarily feature historic or religious themes. His works include Russia the Eternal, The 20th Century Mystery, The Ruining of the Temple on Easter Night, and illustrations to the works of Fyodor Dostoevsky.

== Biography ==
Ilya Glazunov was born in Leningrad (now Saint Petersburg) to Sergey Fyodorovich Glazunov and Olga Konstantinovna Glazunova (née Flug). Both of his parents originally belonged to Russian nobility. His father was a historian. As a child, Glazunov attended a children's school of arts, and later a secondary art school in the historical district of Petrogradskaya Storona.

During World War II, he survived the Siege of Leningrad. His father, mother and other relatives died in it. In 1942, the then-eleven-year-old was transported from besieged Leningrad along the Road of Life. He stayed in the village of Greblo in the Novgorod region. In 1944, he returned to Leningrad and studied in the Leningrad Secondary Art School. From 1951 to 1957, he studied art at the Leningrad Repin Institute of Arts under the direction of Professor Boris Ioganson.

In 1956, he married Nina Vinogradova-Benois. He painted the image of Nina in many of his works. Nina Aleksandrovna was a descendant of the Benois family, a familiar name in art history. Her uncle was the artistic director of the La Scala Opera for 30 years. On 24 May 1986, Nina Vinogradova-Benois committed suicide, just a few days before the opening of the exhibition of her husband in Manege. Their children, Ivan and Vera, have both become artists. Glazunov's success at the International Competition of Young Artists in Prague prompted the opening of his first single exhibition in Moscow in 1957. Soon after in the 1960s, he traveled to Italy for the first time to paint the portraits of many famous actors and actress, including Gina Lollobrigida and Anita Ekberg. He also painted portraits of many political leaders, including Indira Gandhi, Leonid Brezhnev, Urho Kekkonen, Yury Luzhkov and Andrei Gromyko. In 1978, Glazunov started teaching in the Moscow University of Art. In 1987 he founded the Russian Academy of Painting, Sculpture and Architecture.

During the 1970s, he stood against the general plan for restoration of Moscow that threatened to ruin part of the historic centre of Moscow. Together with Vyacheslav Ovchinnikov he gathered signatures of prominent scientific and cultural figures under a letter of protest that was sent to the Politburo. The project was made public, then heavily criticized and, as a result, was cancelled. This also led to the creation of the civil committee that monitored other reconstruction plans. Glazunov was one of the main advocates behind the restoration of the Cathedral of Christ the Saviour and one of the co-founders of the All-Russian Society for Protection of Historical and Cultural Monuments (VOOPIiK).

Glazunov died from heart failure on 9 July 2017 at the age of 87. He was buried at the Novodevichy Cemetery on July 11.

== Works ==
- The Great Experiment. Glazunov's epic canvas on Russia in the 20th century.
- "Legend of the Grand Inquisitor" Triptych

Illustrations for Dostoevsky's novel The Brothers Karamazov:

- Grand Inquisitor. Left portion of the Triptych.
- Golgotha. Central portion of the Triptych.
- Dostoevsky. Night. Right portion of the Triptych.

== Awards and honours ==
A minor planet, 3616 Glazunov, discovered by Soviet astronomer Lyudmila Zhuravleva in 1984, is named after him.

- Order "For Merit to the Fatherland";
  - 1st class (10 June 2010) – for outstanding contribution to the development of national art, many years of creative and educational activities
  - 2nd class (11 October 2005) – for outstanding achievements in the field of domestic art and education
  - 3rd class (9 June 2000) – for outstanding contribution to the development of national art
  - 4th class (29 May 1995) – for services to the state, achievements in work and significant contribution to strengthening friendship and cooperation between nations
- Order of the Red Banner of Labour (1985)
- People's Artist of the RSFSR (1979)
- People's Artist of the USSR (1980)
- Honoured Worker of the Arts Industry of the RSFSR (1973)
- State Prize of the Russian Federation (1997) – for the restoration of the Moscow Kremlin
- "For Service to Moscow" insignia – for his great services in the arts and arts education
- Order of St. Andrei Rublev, 1st class (Russian Orthodox Church, 4 December 2010) – for outstanding contribution to the development of Russian art in the 80th anniversary of his birth
- Honorary member of the Historical and Patriotic Association "Russian Banner" (1989)
- Perpetual rector of the Russian Academy of Painting, Sculpture and Architecture
- Member of the Academy of Management in Education and Culture (1997)
- "The most outstanding artist of the 20th century" in a poll of polls (1999)
- UNESCO Gold Medal – for "outstanding contribution to world culture"
- Member of the Russian Academy of Arts (2000)
