= Nelidovo =

Nelidovo (Russian: Нелидово) is the name of several inhabited localities in Russia.

Urban localities

- Nelidovo, Nelidovsky District, Tver Oblast, a town of district significance in Nelidovsky District of Tver Oblast

Rural localities

- Nelidovo, Ivanovo Oblast, a village in Zavolzhsky District of Ivanovo Oblast
- Nelidovo, Chukhlomsky District, Kostroma Oblast, a village in Nozhkinskoye Settlement of Chukhlomsky District of Kostroma Oblast
- Nelidovo, Krasnoselsky District, Kostroma Oblast, a village in Borovikovskoye Settlement of Krasnoselsky District of Kostroma Oblast
- Nelidovo, Moscow Oblast, a village in Chismenskoye Rural Settlement of Volokolamsky District of Moscow Oblast
- Nelidovo, Kalininsky District, Tver Oblast, a village in Verkhnevolzhskoye Rural Settlement of Kalininsky District of Tver Oblast
- Nelidovo, Sokolsky District, Vologda Oblast, a village in Vorobyevsky Selsoviet of Sokolsky District of Vologda Oblast
- Nelidovo, Vologodsky District, Vologda Oblast, a village in Raboche-Krestyansky Selsoviet of Vologodsky District of Vologda Oblast
