= Konstantin Fomin =

Russian architect (born 1990)

- Константин Фомин
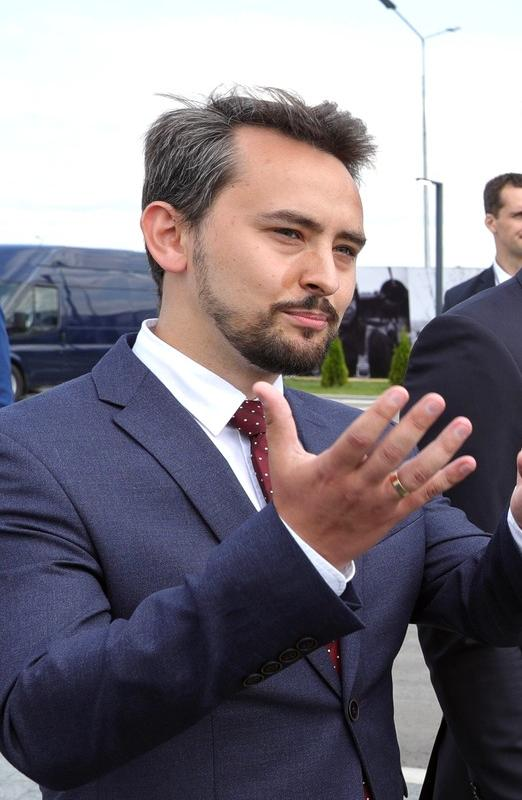
- Born: July 31, 1990 (age 36); Elektrostal, Soviet Union
- Education: Moscow State Pedagogical University; Russian Academy of Painting, Sculpture and Architecture
- Known for: Architect, sculptor
- Notable work: Rzhev Memorial to the Soviet Soldier
- Awards: (2023)

Konstantin Evgenevich Fomin (Russian: Константин Евгеньевич Фомин) (born July 31, 1990) is a Russian architect.

== Biography ==
Konstantin was born in Elektrostal, Moscow Oblast. He graduated from the Elektrostal Children's Art School, then studied at the Art and Graphics Department of the Moscow State Pedagogical University. In 2014, he graduated with honors from the Department of Architecture of Residential and Public Buildings of the Russian Academy of Painting, Sculpture and Architecture. While studying at the academy, he interned and worked in various architectural workshops.

From 2014 to 2017, he worked as an architect at APEX project bureau. He was engaged in the development of design and working documentation, the creation of architectural concepts, adaptation and support of foreign projects. He took part in the design of residential complexes of the PIK Group of Companies.

From 2015 to 2017, as part of an international team, he was involved in the architectural design of the Museum of Contemporary Art and the reconstruction of the historic building of GES-2 based on the design of the architectural bureau Renzo Piano Building Workshop and the leadership of Pritzker Prize laureate Renzo Piano. In June 2024 he was awarded the State Prize of the Russian Federation.
