= Svetlana Zakharova (dancer) =

Ukrainian prima ballerina (born 1979)

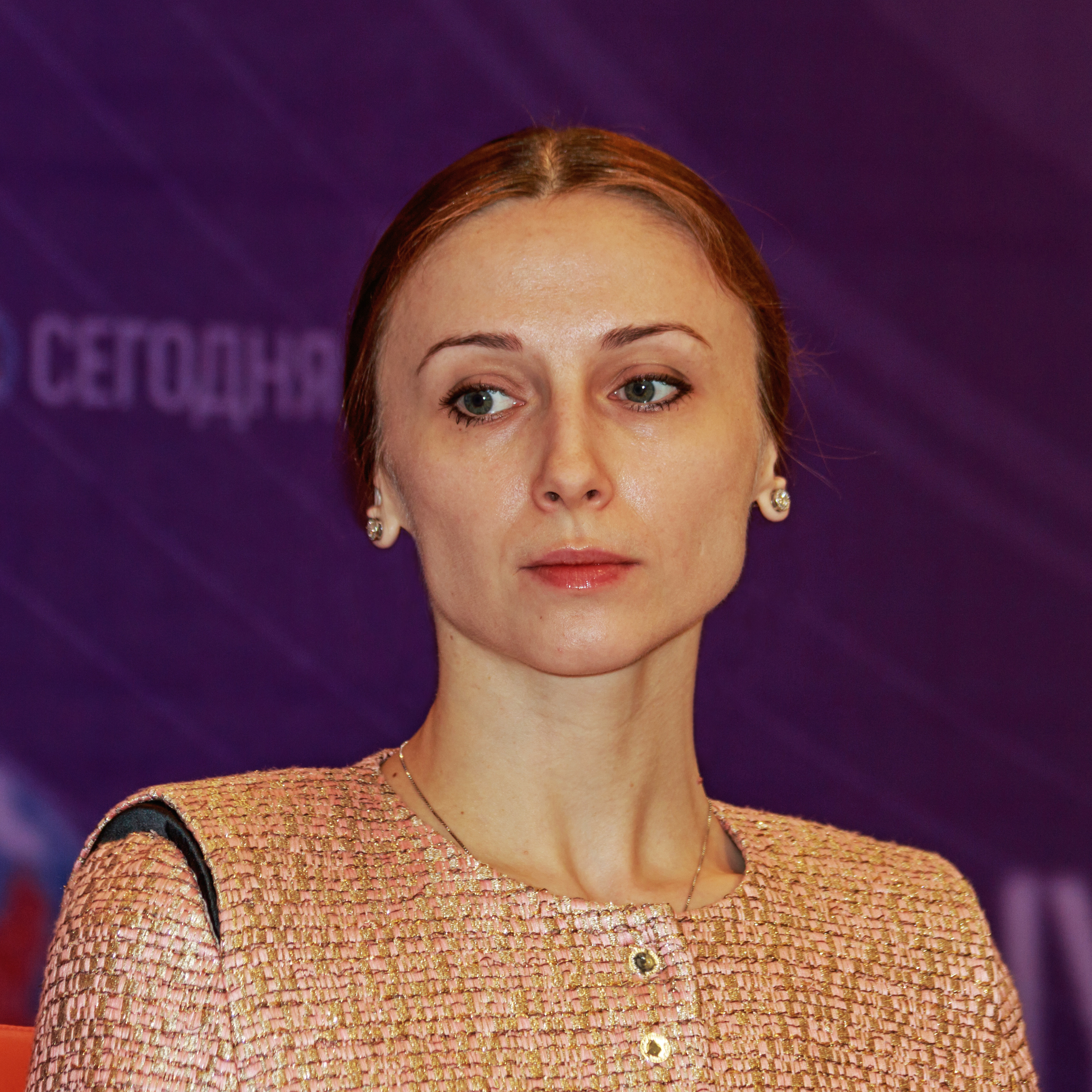
- Zakharova in 2015
- Born: Svetlana Yuryevna Zakharova; 10 June 1979 (age 47); Lutsk, Ukrainian SSR, Soviet Union
- Citizenship: Russian
- Education: Kyiv State Choreographic School, Vaganova Ballet Academy
- Occupation: Ballerina
- Spouse: Vadim Repin
- Career
- Current group: Bolshoi Ballet
- Former groups: Mariinsky Ballet
- Dances: Swan Lake, Giselle, Don Quixote, The Sleeping Beauty, La Bayadère, Raymonda,The Pharaoh's Daughter

Svetlana Yuryevna Zakharova (Ukrainian: Світлана Юріївна Захарова, Russian: Светлана Юрьевна Захарова; born 10 June 1979) is a Ukrainian-born prima ballerina who dances with the Bolshoi Ballet and is acting rector of the Moscow State Academy of Choreography.

== Early life ==
Svetlana Zakharova was born in Lutsk, Ukrainian SSR, Soviet Union, on 10 June 1979. At the age of six, she was taken by her mother to learn folk dancing at a local studio, and by the age of 10, she had auditioned and was accepted into the Kyiv Choreography School. Valeria Sulegina was one of her teachers.

In 1995, after six years at the Kyiv School, Zakharova entered the Young Dancers' Competition (Vaganova-Prix) in St. Petersburg. The youngest contestant, she took second prize and was invited to continue her training in the graduating course of Vaganova Academy of Russian Ballet. It was the first time in the school's history to allow a student to skip two grades.

After attending the pre-eminent Russian ballet school for one year, Zakharova then joined the Mariinsky ballet in 1996.

== Mariinsky Ballet ==
Zakharova debuted with the Mariinsky Ballet in 1996, appearing as Maria with Ruben Bobovnikov, in Rostislav Zakharov's The Fountain of Bakhchisarai.

In 1997, after her first year with the Mariinsky, at 18, Zakharova was promoted to principal dancer. Her first partner was principal Igor Zelensky. Olga Moiseyeva was her coach.

== Bolshoi Ballet ==
By 2003, Zakharova "was getting itchy feet" at the Mariinsky, and moved to the Bolshoi Ballet. The offer from the Bolshoi company was longstanding, and the departure from the Mariinsky was reportedly due to discontent with that company, as well as personal invitation from the legendary Vladimir Vasiliev.

For most of her career Zakharova was coached by Ludmila Semenyaka. At present her coach is Nina Semizorova.

== Rise to fame ==
From 1999 on, Zakharova regularly performed as a guest soloist at the Paris Opera, where she worked with French choreographer Pierre Lacotte. Lacotte is viewed as a leading authority on classical ballet contributing to the career of Evgenia Obraztsova and Hannah O'Neill. Svetlana Zakharova was the first Ukrainian-born Russian principal dancer performing in Paris and became a world star as of 2000.

Successful assignments followed, ranging from great classical roles like Giselle, Odette-Odile in "Swan Lake", Aurora in "Sleeping Beauty", and Nikiya in "La Bayadère," to such modern works as Balanchine's "Serenade", "Symphony in C" and "Apollo" as well as McMillan's "Manon" and Neumeier's "Now and Then"

At La Scala Theatre Ballet in Italy, Zakharova danced with partner Roberto Bolle in Swan Lake, Giselle, The Sleeping Beauty, and La Bayadère. Her association with La Scala ended in 2022.

Other notable appearances: Zakharova was one of the dancers featured in the 2006 documentary Ballerina. She has presented her own TV programme (Svetlana) on Russian television, a festival of children's dance running from 2015 to 2018. As of July 2020, she is also presenting "Bolshoi Ballet", a ballet competition for professional ballet dancers. She has performed in her own solo programme, sold out across Europe, "Modanse", a more modern ballet, and "Coco", a homage to Coco Chanel featuring costumes from the eponymous design house.

In September 2024, Zakharova was appointed acting rector of the Moscow State Academy of Choreography.

== Awards ==
- 1997: Vaganova-Prix Young Dancers Competition, Sankt-Peterburg (2nd prize)
- 1999: Golden Mask for Serenade
- 2000: Golden Mask for The Sleeping Beauty
- 2005: Prix Benois de la Danse for Hippolita (Titania) in A Midsummer Night's Dream
- 2006 : State Prize of the Russian Federation
- 2008 People's Artist of Russia
- 2008 Elected State Duma deputy ( Russian parliament)
- 2015 : Prix Benois de la Danse for Marguerite Gautier in "The Lady of the Camellias" by John Neumeier and Mekhmene-Banu in "Légende d'amour" by Yury Grigorovich

== Personal life ==
Zakharova is married to Russian violinist Vadim Repin, and they have one child, daughter Anna (b. 2011). She had withdrawn from the Bolshoi Ballet tour to London in the summer of 2010, citing a hip injury; she was pregnant at the time. Zakharova returned to dancing, and performed in London on 15 May 2011, in a gala performance celebrating Soviet ballerina Galina Ulanova.

A member of United Russia party, Zakharova is a supporter of Russian President Vladimir Putin and the annexation of Crimea by the Russian Federation during the Russo-Ukrainian War, which led to a break in her relationship with the Kyiv Choreographic School in particular.

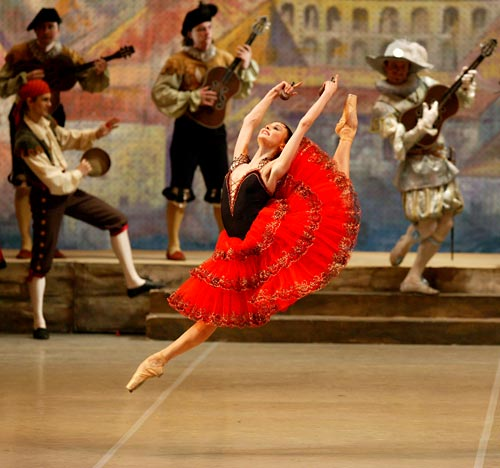

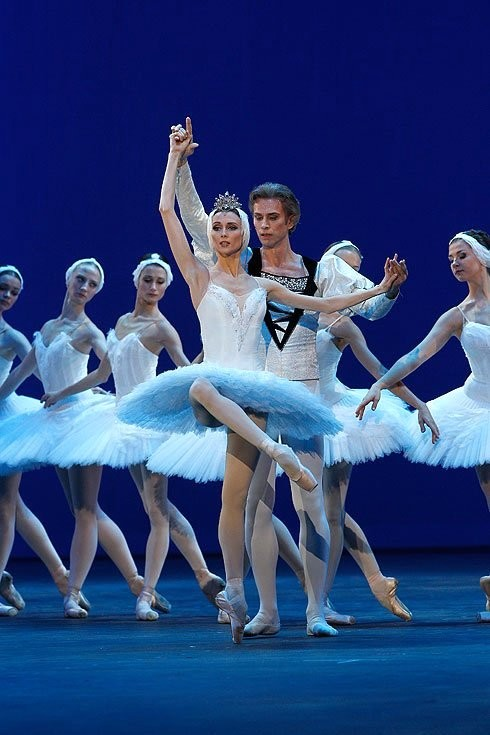

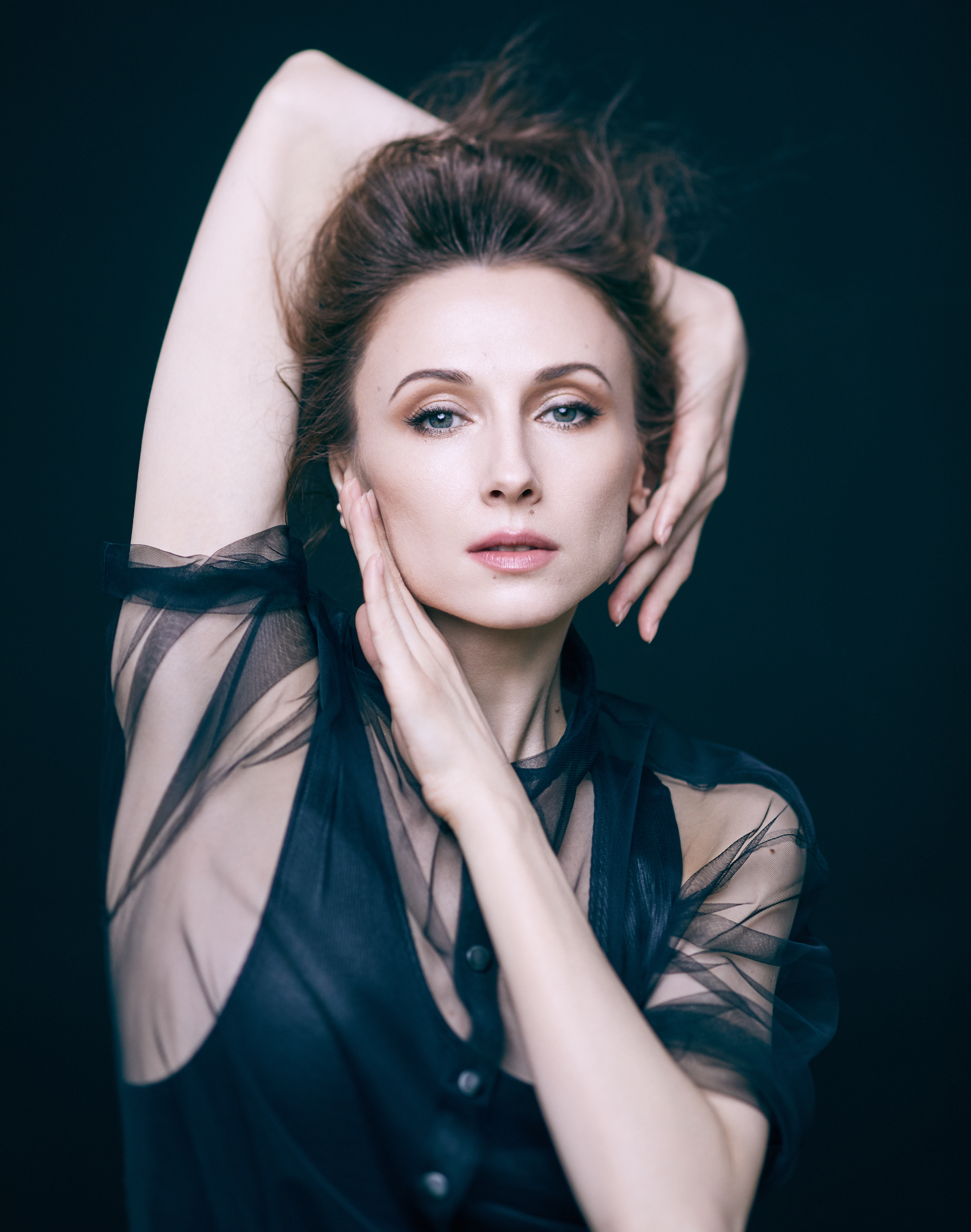

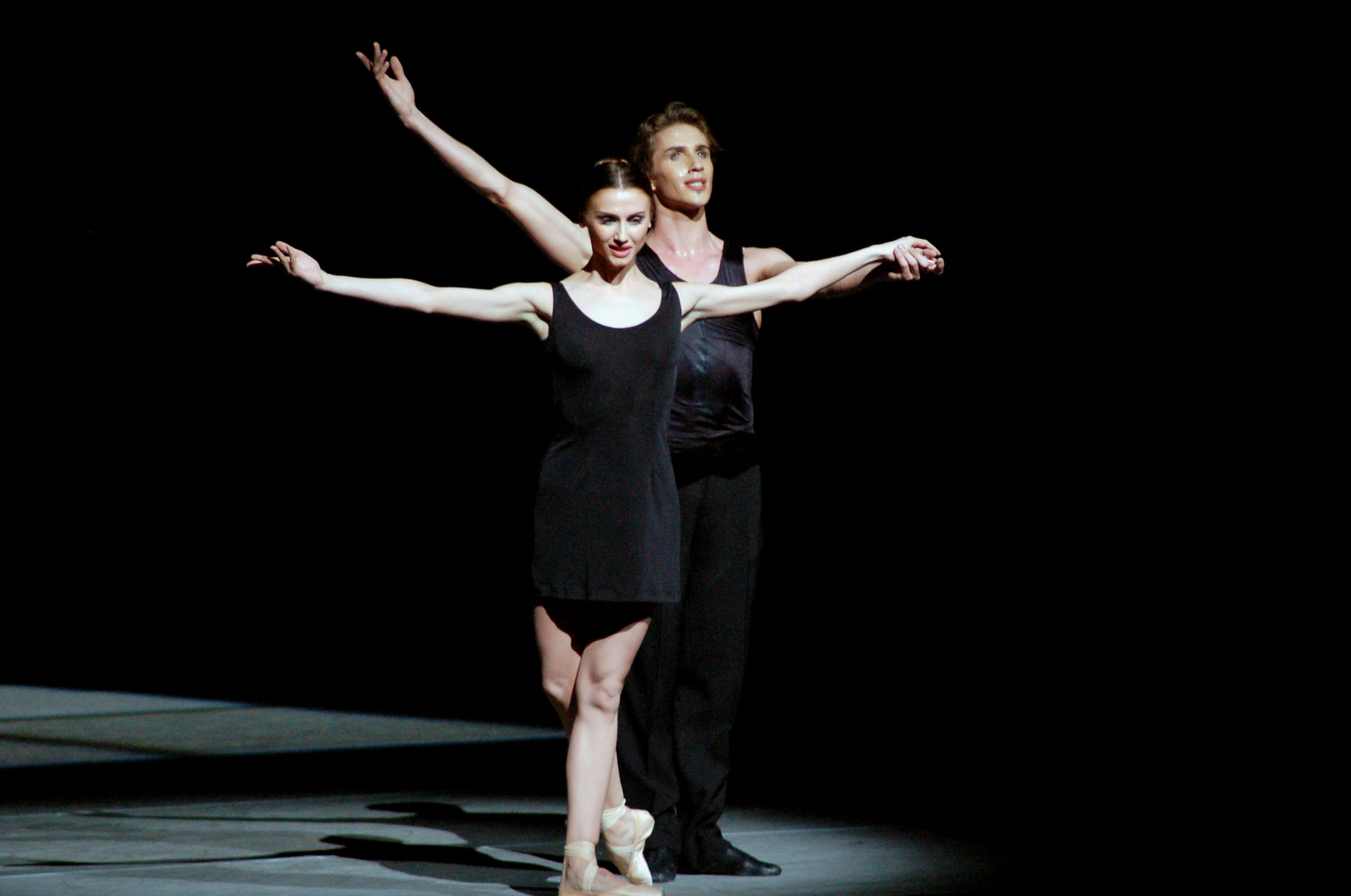
