= Alina Somova =

Russian ballet dancer

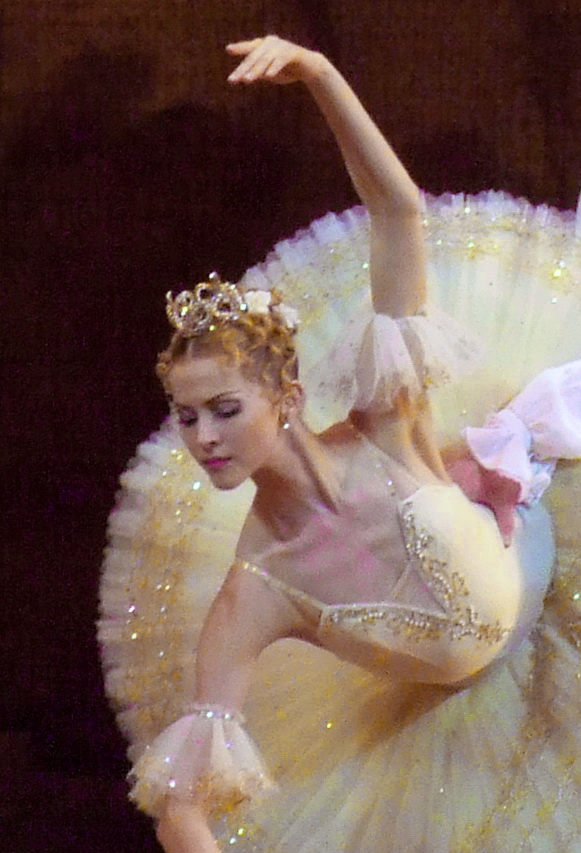
- in The Sleeping Beauty, 2010
- Born: Алина Алексеевна Сомова; 22 October 1985 (age 39); Leningrad, Russian SFSR, Soviet Union (now Saint Petersburg, Russia)
- Education: Dance Krushok School for Children; Vaganova Academy of Russian Ballet
- Occupation: Ballet dancer
- Career
- Current group: Mariinsky Ballet
- Dances: Swan Lake, Giselle, Don Quixote, The Sleeping Beauty, La Bayadère, Raymonda

Alina Alekseevna Somova (Russian: Али́на Алексе́евна Со́мова; born 22 October 1985) is a Russian ballet dancer and principal dancer with the Mariinsky Ballet of Saint Petersburg.

== Early life ==
When Somova was young, she went to a regular Saint Petersburg school and then to a special math school at her mother's insistence. She was not able to excel in sports like her mother wished due to Russia's political and economic transition in the 1990s. Because of this, she was then introduced to ballet at the Dance Krushok school for children where she was recognized for her physical gifts for dancing. After it came time to choose math or ballet, she claimed there was no choice and then admitted herself to a one-year pre-curriculum program at the Vaganova Academy, before embarking on the eight-year course. She was a prize-winner at the Vaganova-Prix International Ballet Competition in St. Petersburg in 2002, and graduated in 2003 under the class of Lyudmila Safronova.

As of 2023, Somova has two children and lives in Georgia.

== Career ==
After graduating from the ballet school in 2003 at age 17, she then joined the Mariinsky Ballet under the Artistic Director Makhar Vaziev. During her first year in the company, she was given the unusual honor of dancing Odette/Odile in Swan Lake on 13 May 2003. She was one of the youngest dancers in the company history to attain this kind of recognition. Advancing quickly, she became a soloist in 2004. She began at the Mariinsky Ballet by learning the Swan Lake variations under her teacher at the time, Olga Ivanovna Chenchikova. She was also coached by Tatiana Terekhova who oversaw her rehearsals of George Balanchine's Symphony in C. Somova rapidly climbed the ranks, being promoted to principal in 2008. In 2009, for her performance as the Tsar Maiden in the ballet The Little Humpbacked Horse, Somova received a Golden Mask in the Best Female Role category. Somova still remains as a principal today.

Somova was one of the featured dancers in the 2006 documentary Ballerina.

== Repertoire ==
Title	Role	Choreography
Giselle	Giselle	Jean Coralli, Jules Perrot, and Marius Petipa
Le Corsaire	Medora	Marius Petipa
La Bayadère	Nikia	Marius Petipa. Revised version by Vladimir Ponomarev, and Vakhtang Chabukiani
The Sleeping Beauty	Princess Aurora, Candide Fairy, and Princess Florine	Marius Petipa. Revised version by Konstantin Sergeyev
Swan Lake	Odette/Odile	Marius Petipa, Lev Ivanov. Revised version by Konstantin Sergeyev
Le Papillion	Pas de Deux	Marie Taglioni. Revival by Pierre Lacotte
Don Quixote	Kitri, Queen of the Dryads, and Variation in Avt IV	Alexander Gorsky after Marius Petipa
Serenade	Soloist	George Balanchine
Jewels	Diamonds and Rubies	George Balanchine
Symphony in C	I. Allegro vivo, and II. Adagio	George Balanchine
Piano Concerto No 2	Ballet Imperial	George Balanchine
Apollo	Terpsichore	George Balanchine
Romeo and Juliet	Juliet	Leonid Lavrovsky
The Nutcracker	Masha	Vasily Vainonen
Sylvia	Sylvia	Frederick Ashton
The Legend of Love	Shyrin	Yuri Grigorovich
The Little Humpbacked Horse	Tsar Maiden	Alexei Ratmansky
Études	Soloist	Harald Lander
