= Russian Academy of Painting, Sculpture and Architecture =

Art school in Moscow, Russia

- Российская академия живописи, ваяния и зодчества
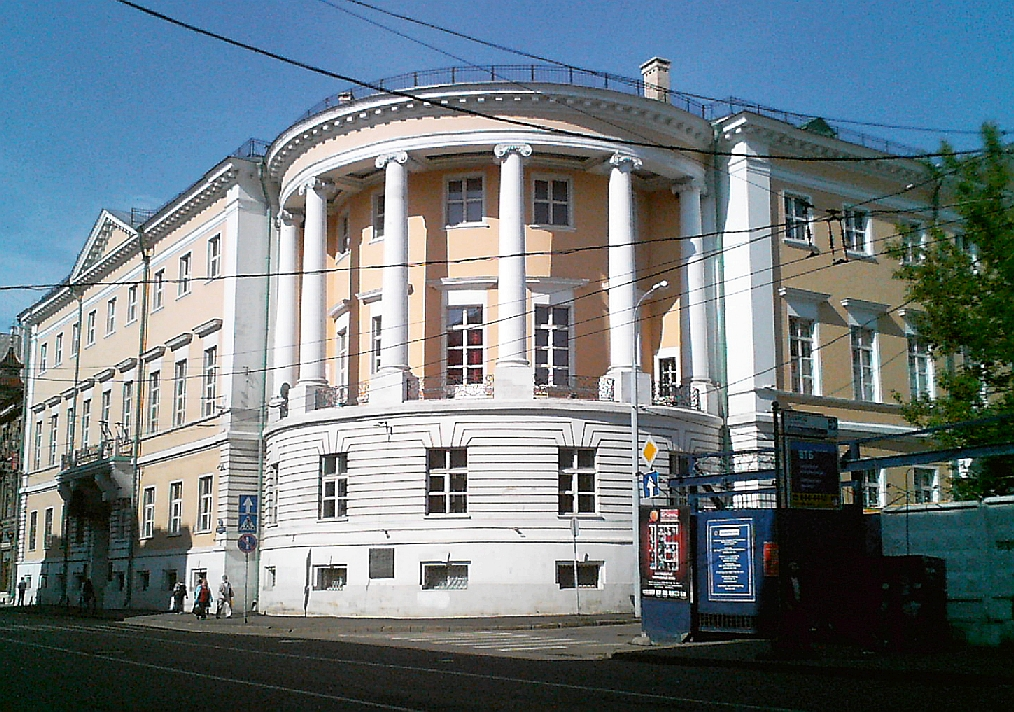
- Former names: Moscow School of Painting, Sculpture and Architecture
- Type: Art school
- Established: 1987
- Location: 21 Myasnitskaya str., Moscow, Russia; 55°45′51″N 37°38′09″E
- Website: glazunov-academy.ru

Russian Academy of Painting, Sculpture and Architecture (Russian: Российская академия живописи, ваяния и зодчества) is a higher educational institution of art established by Ilya Glazunov in Moscow, Russia.

== History ==
The academy was founded in 1987 by People's Artist of the USSR Ilya Glazunov. The academy's educational buildings are located in the center of Moscow, in particular in the "Yushkov House", built by the architect V. Bazhenov in the 18th century which earlier also housed the Moscow School of Painting, Sculpture and Architecture, as well as in the famous "house of the writers’ cooperative" in Kamergersky Lane.

The academy has 5 faculties, postgraduate studies, assistantship-internships, 10 departments, of which 7 are graduating, a museum and a scientific library. The Ural branch of the Russian Academy of Painting, Sculpture and Architecture of Ilya Glazunov is located in Perm.

The academy's scientific and teaching staff consists of 140 people, including two People's Artists of the Russian Federation: Ivan Glazunov and Salavat Shcherbakov; seven honored artists of the Russian Federation: Nikolay Sidorov, Stanislav Moskvitin, Dmitry Slepushkin, Alexander Afonin, Konstantin Zubrilin, Yuri Sergeev, Igor Lapin. Ten teachers of the academy are academicians and corresponding members of the Russian Academy of Arts.

Five faculties of the academy (painting, painting restoration, sculpture, art history, architecture) offer preparatory courses.

An Order of the Government of Russia issued on 31 of January 2012 confirmed the academy's charter.

According to Order of the Government of the Russia of January 18, 2014, the rector of the academy is appointed by the Government of the Russian Federation.
