= List of Buran missions =

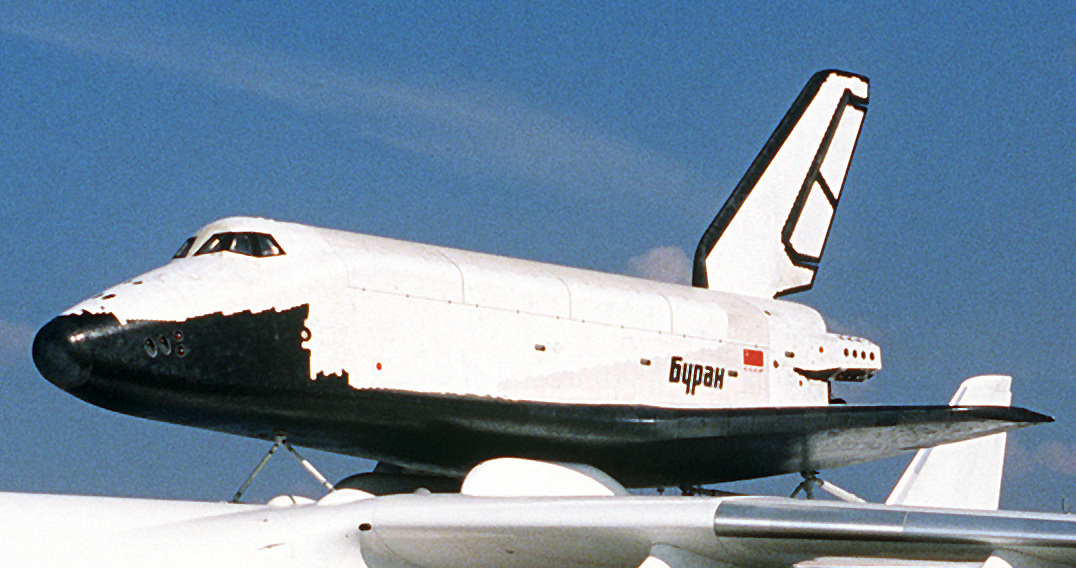
Buran spacecraft at an airshow in 1989

The Buran programme was an attempt by the Soviet Union to construct an orbital spaceplane to perform similar functions to the Space Shuttle. Similar to the Space Shuttle programme, an aerodynamic prototype and a number of operational spacecraft were planned for the Buran programme, which were known as "Buran-class orbiters".

== Test flights ==
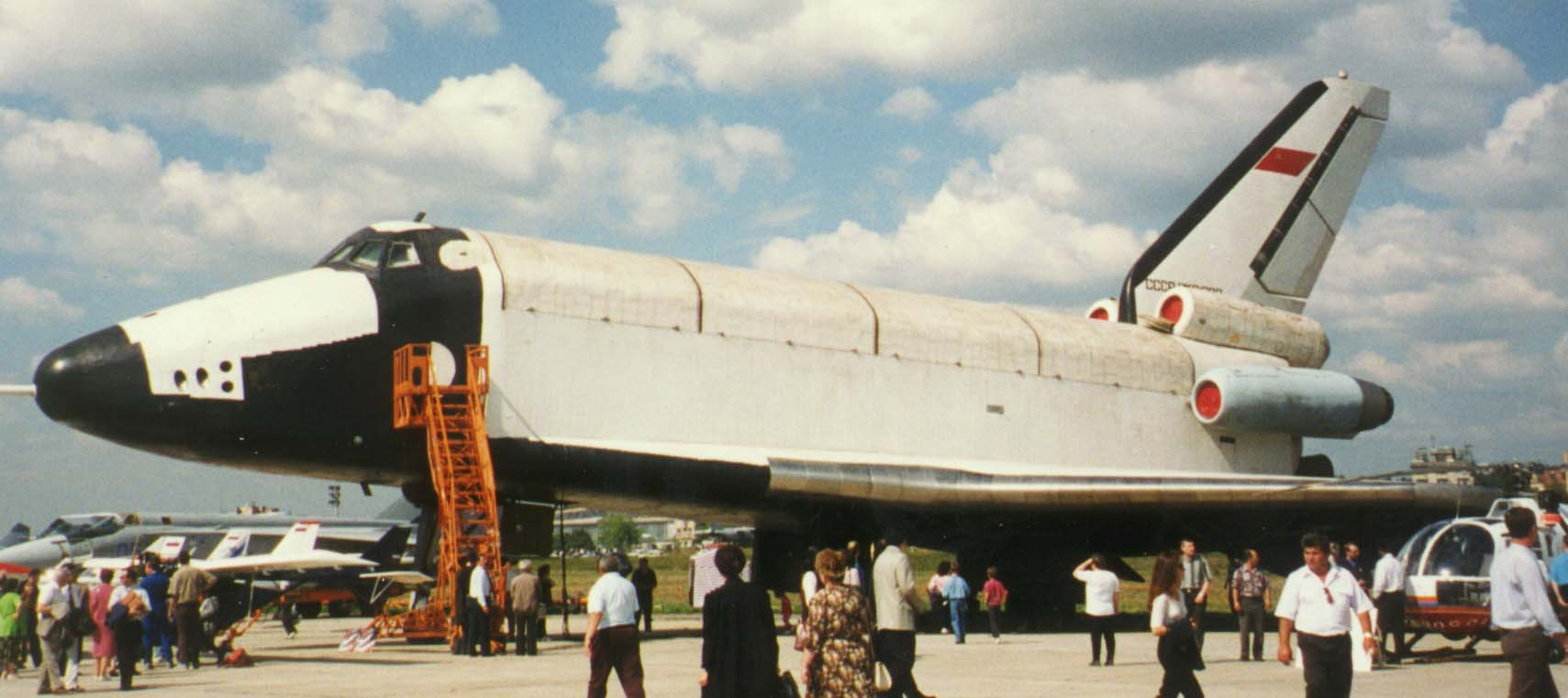
OK-GLI at an airshow in 1997

The aerodynamic testbed OK-GLI was constructed in 1984 to test the in-flight properties of the Buran design. Unlike the American prototype Enterprise, OK-GLI had four AL-31 turbofan engines fitted, meaning it was able to fly under its own power.

The list does not include taxi tests without takeoffs. All of these missions were landed at the Gromov Flight Research Institute test base.

No	Flight date	Crew	Duration	Notes	Sources
1	10 November 1985	Rimantas Stankevičius; Igor Volk	00d 00h 12m	First flight of OK-GLI	
2	3 January 1986	Rimantas Stankevičius; Igor Volk	00d 00h 36m		
3	27 May 1986	Rimantas Stankevičius; Igor Volk	00d 00h 23m		
4	11 June 1986	Rimantas Stankevičius; Igor Volk	00d 00h 22m	Semi-automatic gliding	
5	20 June 1986	Anatoli Levchenko; Alexandr Shchukin	00d 00h 25m	Semi-automatic gliding	
6	28 June 1986	Anatoli Levchenko; Alexandr Shchukin	00d 00h 23m	Semi-automatic gliding	
7	10 December 1986	Rimantas Stankevičius; Igor Volk	00d 00h 24m	Automated control turned off before touchdown; Considered the first automatic landing	
8	23 December 1986	Rimantas Stankevičius; Igor Volk	00d 00h 17m	Automatic landing	
9	29 December 1986	Anatoli Levchenko; Alexandr Shchukin	00d 00h 17m	Automatic landing	
10	16 February 1987	Rimantas Stankevičius; Igor Volk	00d 00h 28m	Officially the first fully automatic landing	
11	21 May 1987	Anatoli Levchenko; Alexander Shchukin	00d 00h 20m	Automatic landing	
12	25 June 1987	Rimantas Stankevičius; Igor Volk	00d 00h 19m	Automatic landing	
13	5 October 1987	Alexander Shchukin; Igor Volk	00d 00h 21m	Automatic landing	
14	15 October 1987	Ivan Bachurin; Alexei Borodai	00d 00h 19m	Automatic landing	
15	16 January 1988	Rimantas Stankevičius; Igor Volk	00d 00h 22m	Automatic landing	
16	24 January 1988	Rimantas Stankevičius; Igor Volk	00d 00h 11m	Automatic landing	
17	23 February 1988	Ivan Bachurin; Alexei Borodai	00d 00h 22m	First flight of extended test program.; Automatic landing	
18	4 March 1988	Rimantas Stankevičius; Igor Volk	00d 00h 32m	Automatic landing	
19	12 March 1988	Ivan Bachurin; Alexei Borodai	00d 00h 20m	Automatic landing	
20	23 March 1988	Ivan Bachurin; Alexei Borodai	00d 00h 43m	Automatic landing	
21	28 March 1988	Ivan Bachurin; Alexei Borodai	00d 00h 19m	Automatic landing	
22	2 April 1988	Rimantas Stankevičius; Alexander Schukin	00d 00h 20m	Automatic landing	
23	8 April 1988	Rimantas Stankevičius; Alexander Schukin	00d 00h 21m	Automatic landing	
24	15 April 1988	Rimantas Stankevičius; Igor Volk	00d 00h 19m	Automatic landing; Last flight of OK-GLI	

== Launches and orbital flights ==
The first operational orbiter, Buran flew one test mission, designated 1K1, on November 15, 1988 at 6:00:00 Moscow time. The spacecraft was launched uncrewed from and landed at Baikonur Cosmodrome in the Kazakh S.S.R. and flew two orbits, traveling 83,707 km (52,013 mi) in 3 hours, 25 minutes (0.14 flight days). Buran never flew again; the program was cancelled shortly after the dissolution of the Soviet Union. In 2002, the Buran orbiter was destroyed by the collapse of the hangar in which it was stored.

No	Launch date	Mission	Shuttle	Crew	Duration	Landing site	Notes	Sources
1	15 November 1988; 03:00:01 UTC; 06:00:01 MSK	1K1	Buran	0	00d 3h 25m	Baikonur	Only flight of Buran; Only uncrewed flight of Space Shuttle type vehicle	

== Cancelled missions ==
=== Planned in 1989 ===
No	Launch date	Mission	Shuttle	Crew	Duration	Landing site	Mission details
2	Q4 1991	2K1	1.02	None	2d	Baikonur	First flight of 1.02
3	Q1-Q2 1992	2K2	1.02	None	7-8d	Baikonur	Mir docking
4	1993	1K2	Buran	None	15-20d	Baikonur	
5	1994	3K1	2.01	Igor Volk; Aleksandr Ivanchenkov	1d	Baikonur	First crewed flight First flight of 2.01
6	1994			two cosmonauts		Baikonur	Second crewed flight
7	1994			two cosmonauts		Baikonur	Third crewed flight
8	1995			two cosmonauts		Baikonur	Fourth crewed flight
9	1995			two cosmonauts		Baikonur	Fifth crewed flight Last planned orbital test flight

=== Planned in 1991 ===
Due to shortening of the program and delays in second flight preparations, mission plan for second orbiter included almost all significant test tasks.

- automatic docking with Mir's Kristall module
- crew transfer from Mir to the shuttle, with testing of some of its systems in the course of twenty-four hours, including the remote manipulator
- undocking and autonomous flight in orbit
- docking of the crewed Soyuz-TM №101 with the shuttle
- crew transfer from the Soyuz to the shuttle and onboard work over the course of twenty-four hours
- automatic undocking and landing

No	Launch Date	Mission	Shuttle	Crew	Duration	Landing Site	Mission details
2	1992	2K1	1.02	None	7-8d		Mir docking

== See also ==
- List of Space Shuttle missions

== Bibliography ==
- Hendrickx, Bart; Vis, Bert (2007). Energiya-Buran: the Soviet space shuttle. Springer. doi:10.1007/978-0-387-73984-7. ISBN 9780387739847.
