= Buran programme =

Soviet spacecraft research project, 1976–1993

- Многоразовая Космическая Система «Буран» Mnogorazovaya Kosmicheskaya Sistema "Buran"
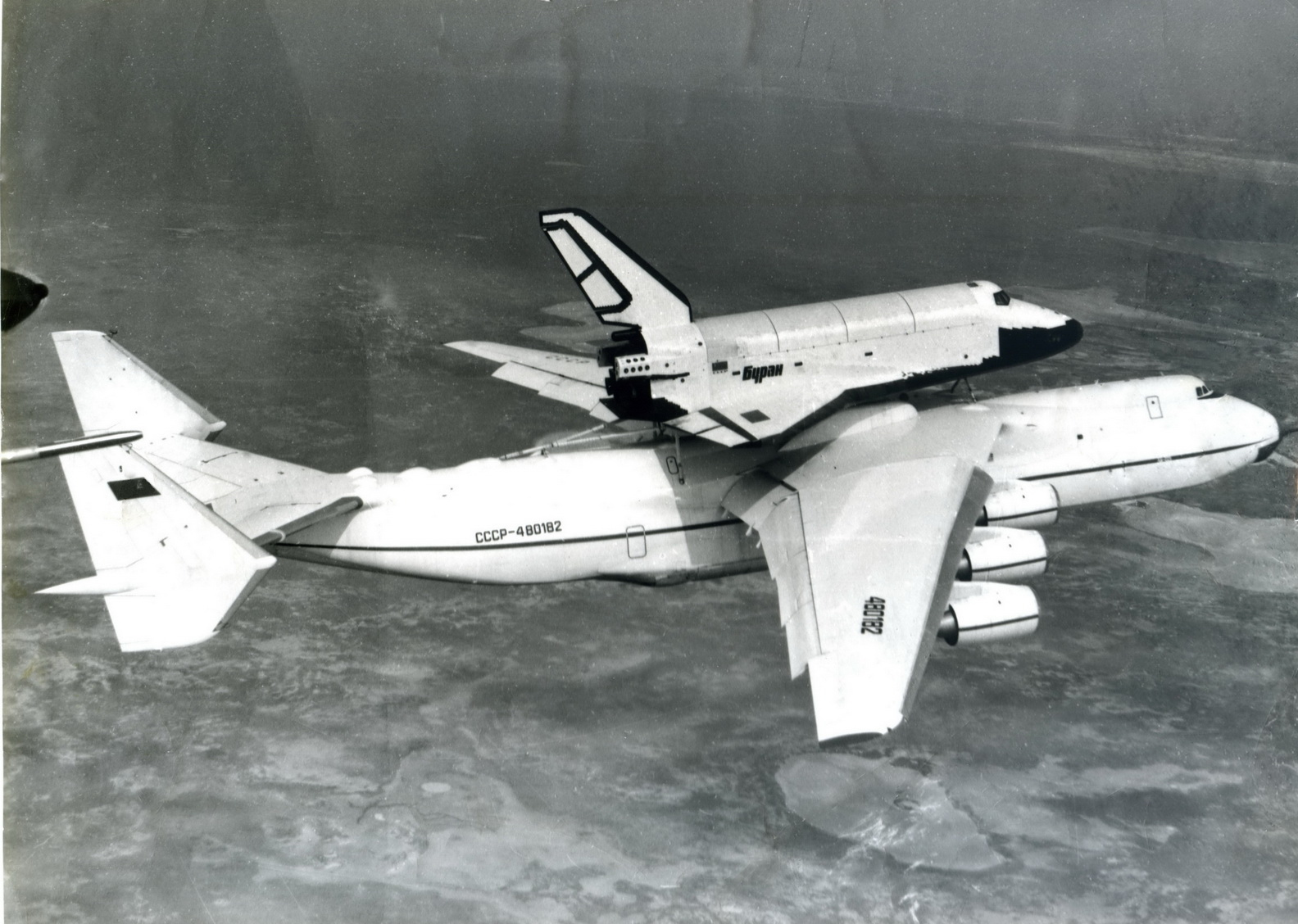
- The Antonov An-225 Mriya carrying Buran in 1989.

Program overview
- Country: Soviet Union / Russia
- Organisation: Roscosmos (1991–1993)
- Purpose: Crewed orbital flight and reentry
- Status: Cancelled

Programme history
- Cost: Rbl 17.8 billion (1990) (US$74 billion in 2026)
- Duration: 1976–1993 (Note: The program was suspended in 1993, but an official decree ending the project was never issued.)
- First flight: 10 November 1985 (GLI-1)
- Last flight: 15 November 1988 (1K1)
- Successes: 1
- Failures: 0
- Launch site: Baikonur pad 110/37

Vehicle information
- Crewed vehicle: Buran-class orbiter
- Crew capacity: 10 cosmonauts
- Launch vehicle: Energia

The Buran programme (Russian: Буран, IPA: [bʊˈran], lit. 'Snowstorm' or 'Blizzard') was a Soviet and later Russian reusable spacecraft project to develop the Energia-Buran system, officially known as the Reusable Space System "Buran" (Многоразовая Космическая Система «Буран»), that formally began in 1976 and was suspended in 1993. In addition to being the designation for the whole Soviet/Russian reusable spacecraft project, Buran was also the name given to orbiter 1K, which completed one uncrewed spaceflight in 1988 and was the only Soviet reusable spacecraft to be launched into space. The Buran orbiters used the expendable Energia rocket as a launch vehicle.

The Buran programme was started by the Soviet Union as a response to the United States Space Shuttle programme. The latter's unclassified nature was a boon for the Soviets and resulted in many superficial and functional similarities between American and Soviet shuttle designs. Although the Buran orbiter was similar in appearance to NASA's Space Shuttle orbiter, and could similarly operate as a re-entry spaceplane, its final internal and functional design was different. For example, the main engines during launch were on the Energia rocket and were not taken into orbit by the spacecraft. Smaller rocket engines on the craft's body provided propulsion in orbit and de-orbital burns, similar to the Space Shuttle's OMS pods. Unlike the Space Shuttle whose first orbital spaceflight was accomplished in April 1981, Buran, whose first and only spaceflight occurred in November 1988, had a capability of flying uncrewed missions, as well as performing fully automated landings. The project was the largest and the most expensive in the history of Soviet space exploration.

== Background ==
The Soviet reusable spacecraft programme has its roots in the late 1950s, at the very beginning of the space age. The idea of Soviet reusable space flight is very old, though it was neither continuous nor consistently organised. Before Buran, no project of the programme reached operational status.

The first step toward a reusable Soviet spacecraft was the 1954 Burya, a high-altitude prototype jet aircraft/cruise missile. Several test flights were made before it was cancelled by order of the Central Committee. The Burya had the goal of delivering a nuclear payload, presumably to the United States, and then returning to base. The Burya programme was cancelled by the USSR in favour of a decision to develop ICBMs instead. The next iteration of a reusable spacecraft was the Zvezda design, which also reached a prototype stage. Decades later, another project with the same name would be used as a service module for the International Space Station. After Zvezda, there was a hiatus in reusable projects until Buran.

The Buran orbital vehicle programme was developed in response to the U.S. Space Shuttle programme, which raised considerable concerns among the Soviet military and especially Defense Minister Dmitry Ustinov. An authoritative chronicler of the Soviet and later Russian space programme, the academic Boris Chertok, recounts how the programme came into being. According to Chertok, after the U.S. developed its Space Shuttle programme, the Soviet military became suspicious that it could be used for military purposes, due to its enormous payload, several times that of previous U.S. launch vehicles. Officially, the Buran orbital vehicle was designed for the delivery to orbit and return to Earth of spacecraft, cosmonauts, and supplies. Both Chertok and Gleb Lozino-Lozinskiy (General Designer and General Director of NPO Molniya) suggest that from the beginning, the programme was military in nature; however, the exact military capabilities, or intended capabilities, of the Buran programme remain classified.

Like its American counterpart, the Buran orbital vehicle, when in transit from its landing sites back to the launch complex, was transported on the back of a large jet aeroplane – the Antonov An-225 Mriya transport aircraft, which was designed in part for this task and was the largest aircraft in the world to fly multiple times. Before the Mriya was ready (after the Buran had flown), the Myasishchev VM-T Atlant, a variant on the Soviet Myasishchev M-4 Molot (Hammer) bomber (NATO code: Bison), fulfilled the same role.

== History of the Buran programme ==
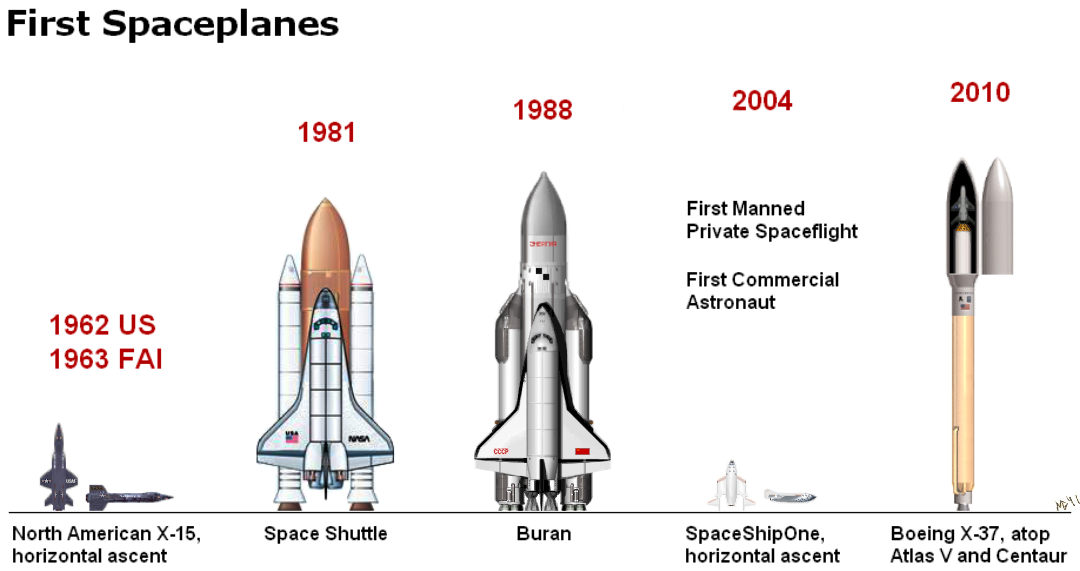
The Buran orbiter ranks among the world's first spaceplanes, with the North American X-15, the Space Shuttle, SpaceShipOne, and the Boeing X-37. Of these, only the Buran and X-37 spaceflights were uncrewed.

=== Programme development ===
The development of the Buran began in the early 1970s as a response to the U.S. Space Shuttle programme. Soviet officials were concerned about a perceived military threat posed by the U.S. Space Shuttle. In their opinion, the Shuttle's 30-ton payload-to-orbit capacity and, more significantly, its 15-ton payload return capacity, were a clear indication that one of its main objectives would be to place massive experimental laser weapons into orbit that could destroy enemy missiles from a distance of several thousands of kilometres. Their reasoning was that such weapons could only be effectively tested in actual space conditions and that to cut their development time and save costs it would be necessary to regularly bring them back to Earth for modifications and fine-tuning. Soviet officials were also concerned that the U.S. Space Shuttle could make a sudden dive into the atmosphere to drop nuclear bombs on Moscow.

In 1974, Valentin Glushko's design bureau, OKB-1 (later NPO Energiya), proposed a new family of heavy-lift rockets called RLA (Russian: РЛА, «Ракетные Летательные Аппараты», romanized: Raketnyye Letatel'niye Apparaty, lit. 'Rocket Flying Apparatus'). The RLA concept included the use of kerosene and liquid hydrogen as fuel, and liquid oxygen as oxidizer (both new technologies in the Soviet space programme), with the shuttle orbiter being one possible payload. While NPO Molniya conducted development under the lead of Gleb Lozino-Lozinskiy, the Soviet Union's Military-Industrial Commission, or VPK, was tasked with collecting all data it could on the U.S. Space Shuttle. Under the auspices of the KGB, the VPK was able to amass documentation on the American shuttle's airframe designs, design analysis software, materials, flight computer systems and propulsion systems. The KGB targeted many university research project documents and databases, including Caltech, MIT, Princeton, Stanford and others. The thoroughness of the acquisition of data was made much easier as the U.S. shuttle development was unclassified.

By 1975, NPO Energiya had come up with two competing designs for the orbiter vehicle: the MTKVP (Russian: МТКВП, «Многоразовый Транспортный Корабль Вертикальной Посадки», romanized: Mnogorazoviy Transportniy Korabl' Vertikal'noy Posadki, lit. 'Reusable Vertical Landing Transport Ship'), a 34-meter-long lifting body spaceplane launched on top of a stack of kerosene-fuelled strap on boosters; and the OS-120 (Russian: ОС-120, «Орбитальный Самолет», romanized: Orbital'niy Samolet, lit. 'Orbital Spaceplane–120 tons'), a close copy of the US Space Shuttle based on US Space Shuttle documentation and designs obtained through the VPK and KGB. The OS-120 was a delta-winged spaceplane based heavily on the US Space Shuttle design, equipped with three liquid hydrogen engines, strapped to a detachable external tank and four liquid fuel boosters (NPO Energiya even considered the use of solid propellant rocket boosters, further imitating the US Shuttle's configuration).

A compromise between these two proposals was achieved by NPO Energiya in January 1976 with the OK-92 (Russian: ОК-92, «Орбитальный Корабль», romanized: Orbital'niy Korabl', lit. 'Orbital Ship–92 tons'), a delta-winged orbiter equipped with two Soloviev D-30 turbofan jet engines for autonomous atmospheric flight, launched to space from a rocket stack made of a core stage with three cryogenic engines, and four kerosene-fuelled boosters, each with four engines. By 1978, the OK-92 design was further refined, with its final configuration completed in June 1979.

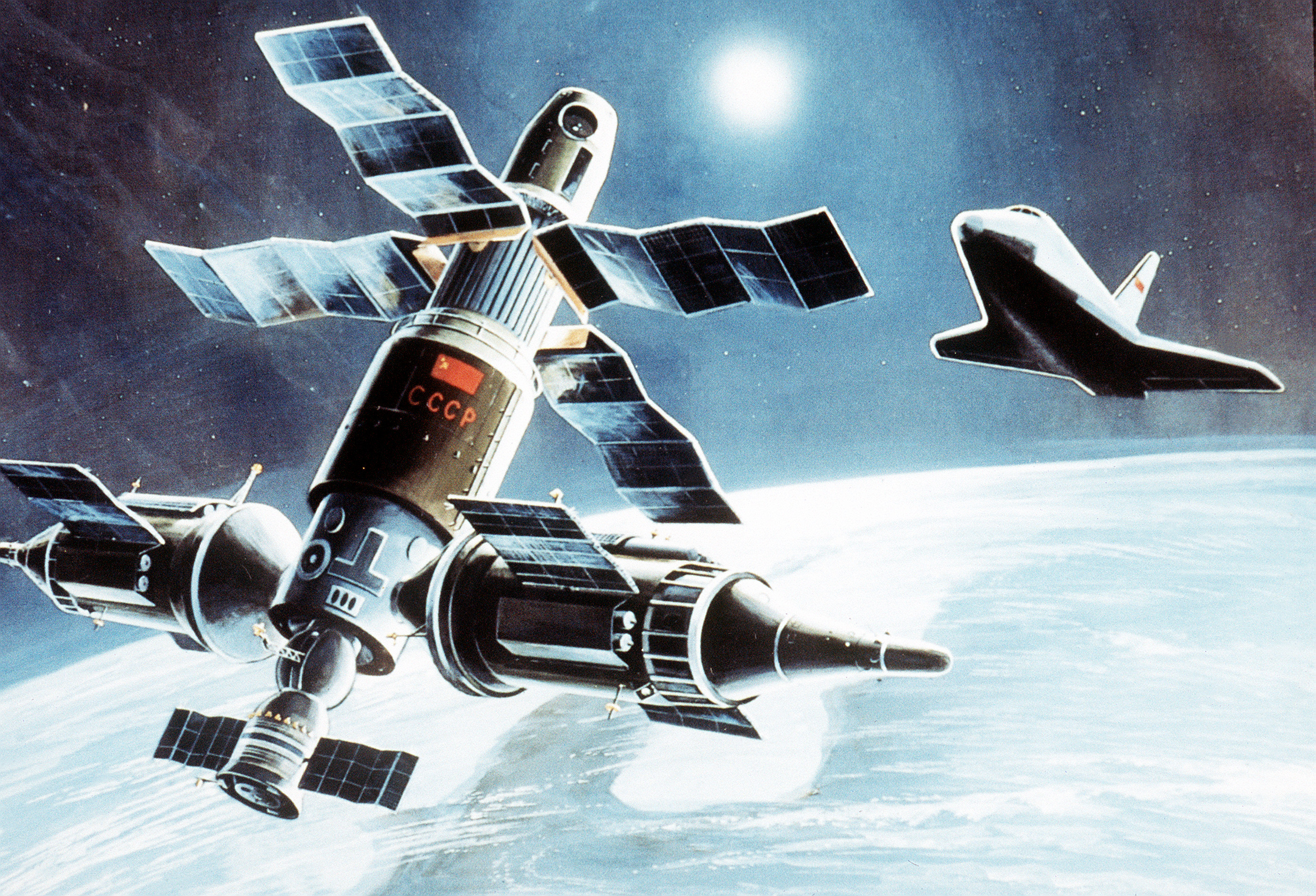
US artist's concept of a Soviet space shuttle approaching a manned space complex.

Soviet engineers were initially reluctant to implement a spacecraft design with so many similarities to the US Space Shuttle. Although it has been commented that wind tunnel testing showed that NASA's design was already ideal, the shape requirements were mandated by its potential military capabilities to transport large payloads to low Earth orbit, themselves a counterpart to the Pentagon's initially projected missions for the Shuttle. Even though the Molniya Scientific Production Association proposed its Spiral programme design (halted 13 years earlier), it was rejected as being altogether dissimilar from the American shuttle design.

The construction of the shuttles began in 1980, and by 1984 the first full-scale Buran was rolled out. The first suborbital test flight of a scale-model (BOR-5) took place as early as July 1983. As the project progressed, five additional scale-model flights were performed. A test vehicle was constructed with four jet engines mounted at the rear; this vehicle is usually referred to as OK-GLI, or as the "Buran aerodynamic analogue". The jets were used to take off from a normal landing strip, and once it reached a designated point, the engines were cut and OK-GLI glided back to land. This provided invaluable information about the handling characteristics of the Buran design, and significantly differed from the carrier plane/air drop method used by the United States and the Enterprise test craft. Twenty-four test flights of OK-GLI were performed by the Gromov Flight Research Institute test pilots and researchers after which the shuttle was "worn out". The developers considered using a couple of Mil Mi-26 helicopters to "bundle" lift the Buran, but test flights with a mock-up showed how risky and impractical that was. The VM-T ferried components and the Antonov An-225 Mriya (the heaviest airplane ever) was designed and used to ferry the shuttle.

Space shuttle Buran 1.02 "Ptichka" in the now-defunct assembly and fueling complex, building 80, site 112A, Baikonur Cosmodrome. 2026

The flight and ground-testing software also required research. In 1983 the Buran developers estimated that the software development would require several thousand programmers if done with their existing methodology (in assembly language), and they appealed to Keldysh Institute of Applied Mathematics for assistance. It was decided to develop a new high-level "problem-oriented" programming language. Researchers at Keldysh developed two languages: PROL2 (used for real-time programming of onboard systems) and DIPOL (used for the ground-based test systems), as well as the development and debugging environment SAPO PROLOGUE. There was also an operating system known as Prolog Manager. Work on these languages continued beyond the end of the Buran programme, with PROL2 being extended into SIPROL, and eventually all three languages developed into DRAKON which is still in use in the Russian space industry. A declassified May 1990 CIA report citing open-source intelligence material states that the software for the Buran spacecraft was written in "the French-developed programming language known as Prolog", possibly due to confusion with the name PROLOGUE.

=== Flight crew preparation ===
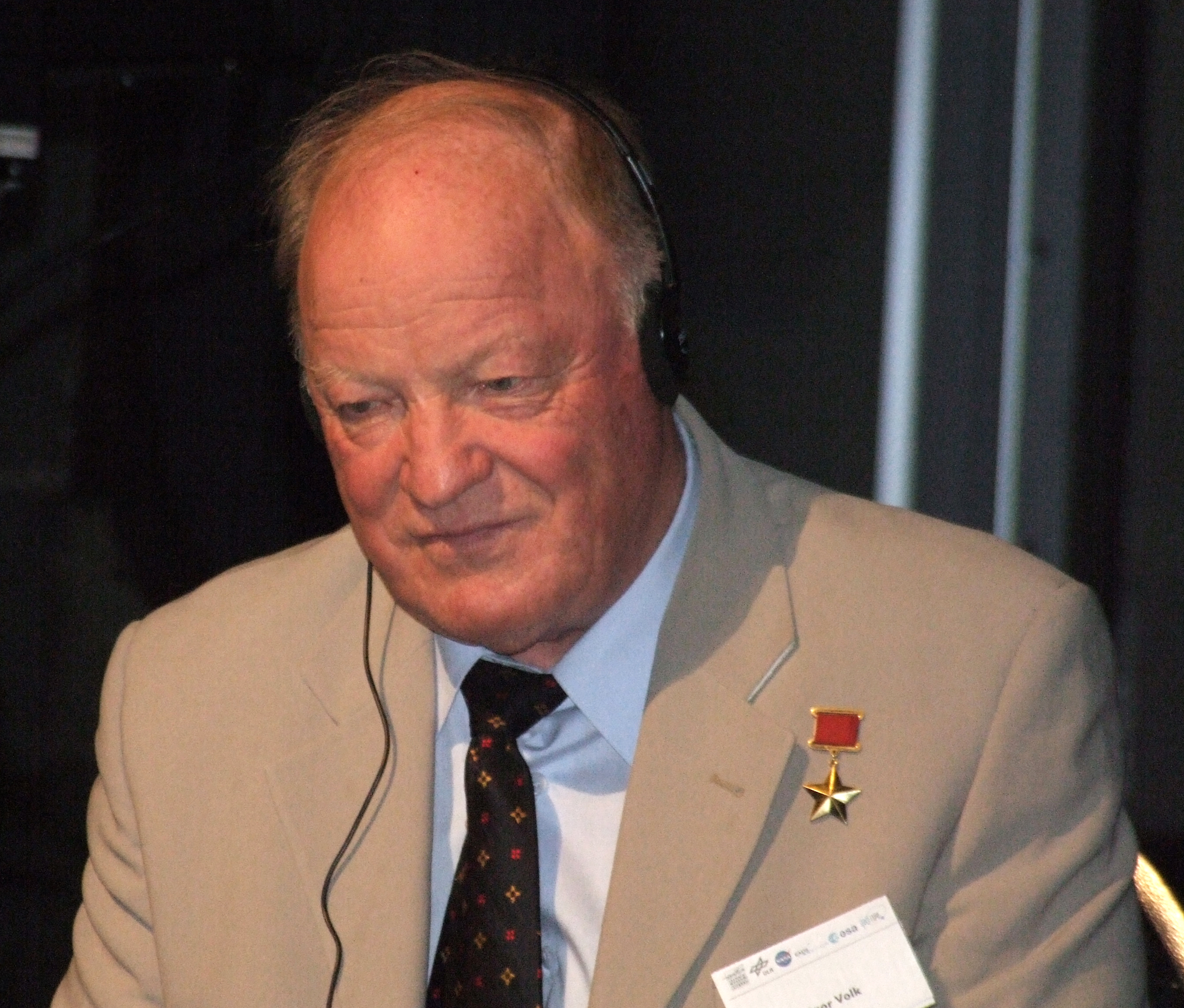
Igor Petrovich Volk, cosmonaut and test pilot of the OK-GLI.

Until the end of the Soviet Union in 1991, seven cosmonauts were allocated to the Buran programme and trained on the OK-GLI ("Buran aerodynamic analogue") test vehicle. All had experience as test pilots. They were: Ivan Ivanovich Bachurin, Alexei Sergeyevich Borodai, Anatoli Semyonovich Levchenko, Aleksandr Vladimirovich Shchukin, Rimantas Antanas Stankevičius, Igor Petrovich Volk, and Viktor Vasiliyevich Zabolotsky.

A rule, set in place for cosmonauts after the failed Soyuz 25 mission of 1977, stipulated that all Soviet space missions must contain at least one crew member who has been to space before. In 1982, it was decided that all Buran commanders and their back-ups would occupy the third seat on a Soyuz mission, prior to their Buran spaceflight. Several people had been selected to potentially be in the first Buran crew. By 1985, it was decided that at least one of the two crew members would be a test pilot trained at the Gromov Flight Research Institute (known as "LII"), and potential crew lists were drawn up. Only two potential Buran crew members reached space: Igor Volk, who flew in Soyuz T-12 to the space station Salyut 7, and Anatoli Levchenko who visited Mir, launching with Soyuz TM-4 and landing with Soyuz TM-3. Both of these spaceflights lasted about a week.

Levchenko died of a brain tumour the year after his orbital flight, Bachurin left the cosmonaut corps because of medical reasons, Shchukin was assigned to the back-up crew of Soyuz TM-4 and later died in a plane crash, Stankevičius was also killed in a plane crash, while Borodai and Zabolotsky remained unassigned to a Soyuz flight until the Buran programme ended.

==== Spaceflight of I. P. Volk ====
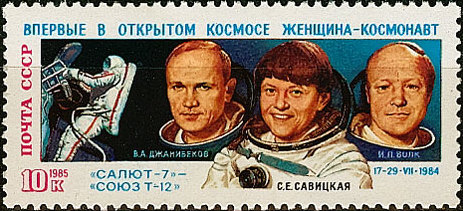
The crew of Soyuz T-12 (Vladimir Dzhanibekov, Svetlana Savitskaya, and Igor Volk) on a stamp issued in 1985

Igor Volk was planned to be the commander of the first crewed Buran flight. There were two purposes of the Soyuz T-12 mission, one of which was to give Volk spaceflight experience. The other purpose, seen as the more important factor, was to beat the United States and have the first spacewalk by a woman. At the time of the Soyuz T-12 mission the Buran programme was still a state secret. The appearance of Volk as a crew member caused some, including the British Interplanetary Society magazine Spaceflight, to ask why a test pilot was occupying a Soyuz seat usually reserved for researchers or foreign cosmonauts.

==== Spaceflight of A. S. Levchenko ====
Anatoli Levchenko was planned to be the back-up commander of the first crewed Buran flight, and in March 1987 he began extensive training for his Soyuz spaceflight. In December 1987, he occupied the third seat aboard Soyuz TM-4 to Mir, and returned to Earth about a week later on Soyuz TM-3. His mission is sometimes called Mir LII-1, after the Gromov Flight Research Institute shorthand. When Levchenko died the following year, it left the back-up crew of the first Buran mission again without spaceflight experience. A Soyuz spaceflight for another potential back-up commander was sought by the Gromov Flight Research Institute, but never occurred.

=== Ground facilities ===
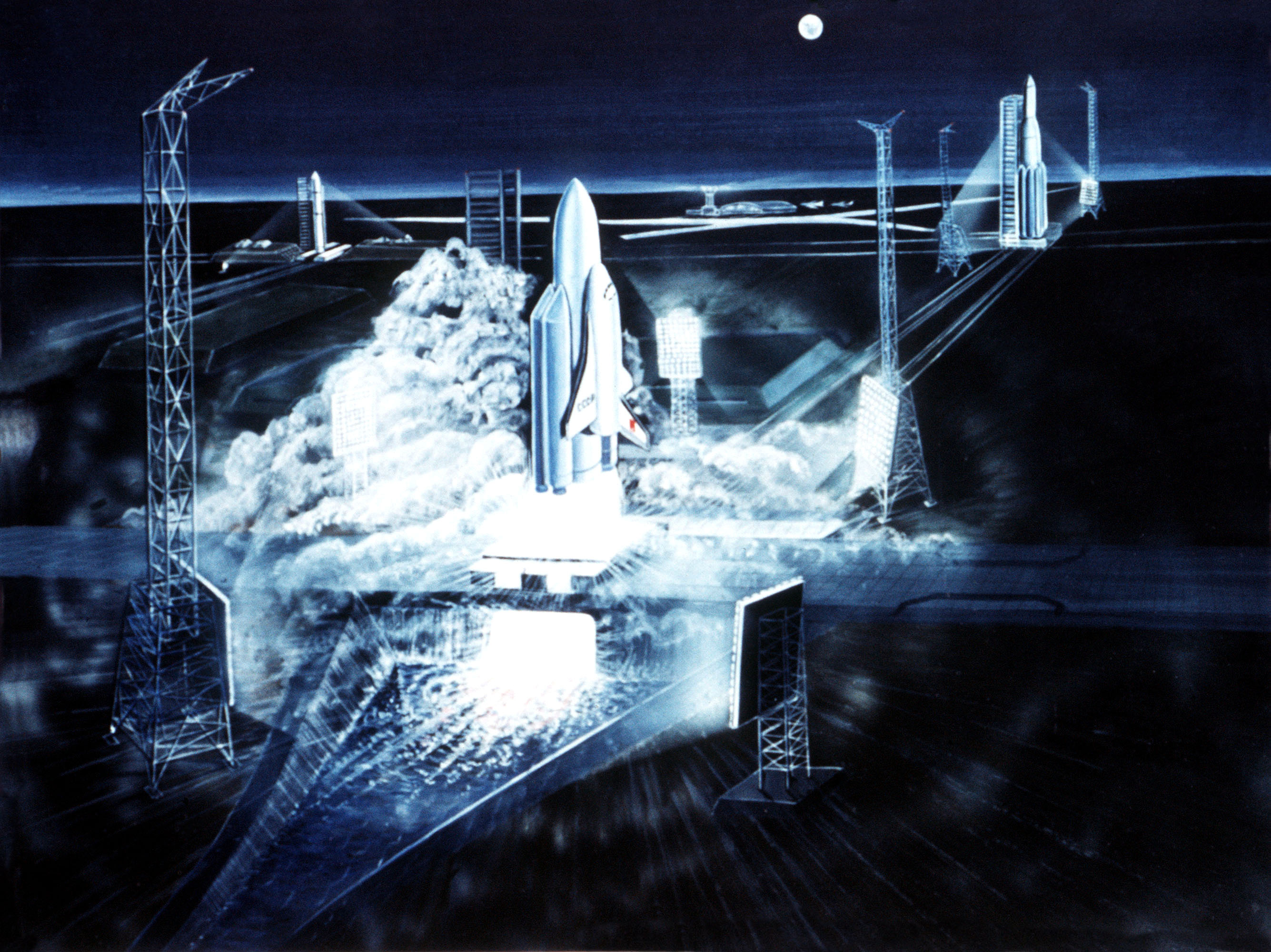
Early illustration of a Buran launch at Baikonur

Maintenance, launches and landings of the Buran-class orbiters were to take place at the Baikonur Cosmodrome in the Kazakh SSR. Several facilities at Baikonur were adapted or newly built for these purposes:

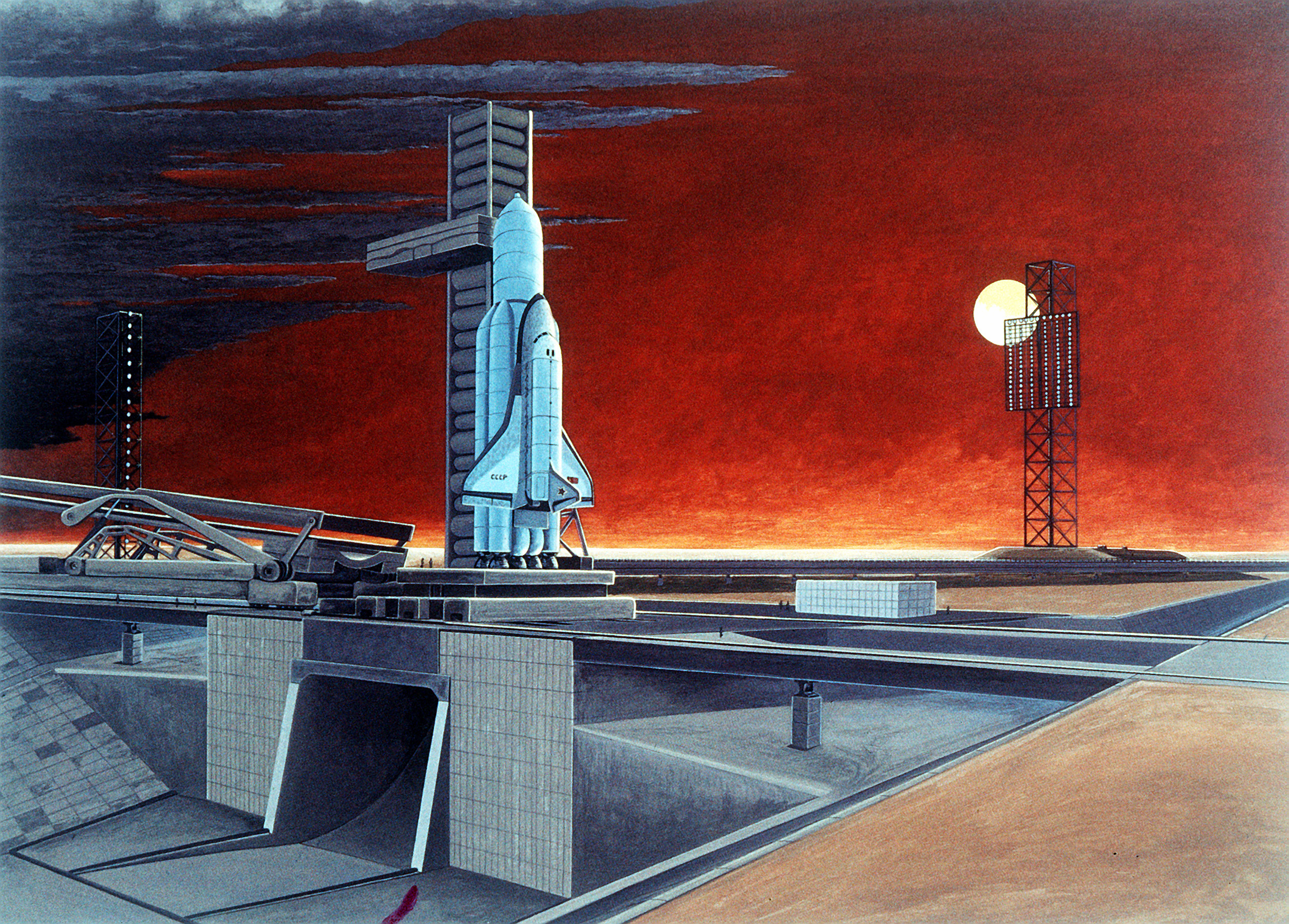
- Illustration of Buran and Energia at Site 110
  Site 110 – Used for the launch of the Buran-class orbiters. Like the assembly and processing hall at Site 112, the launch complex was originally constructed for the Soviet lunar landing programme and later converted for the Energia-Buran program.
- Site 112 – Used for orbiter maintenance and to mate the orbiters to their Energia launchers (thus fulfilling a role similar to the VAB at KSC). The main hangar at the site, called MIK RN or MIK 112, was originally built for the assembly of the N1 Moon rocket. After cancellation of the N-1 programme in 1974, the facilities at Site 112 were converted for the Energia-Buran programme. It was here that orbiter 1K was stored after the end of the Buran programme and was destroyed when the hangar roof collapsed in 2002.
- Site 251 – Used as Buran orbiter landing facility, also known as Yubileyniy Airfield (and fulfilling a role similar to the SLF at KSC). It features one runway, called 06/24, which is 4,500 metres (4,900 yd) long and 84 metres (92 yd) wide, paved with "Grade 600" high quality reinforced concrete. At the edge of the runway was a special mating-demating device, designed to lift an orbiter off its Antonov An-225 Mriya carrier aircraft and load it on a transporter, which would carry the orbiter to the processing building at Site 254. A purpose-built orbiter landing control facility, housed in a large multi-storey office building, was located near the runway. Yubileyniy Airfield was also used to receive heavy transport planes carrying elements of the Energia-Buran system. After the end of the Buran programme, Site 251 was abandoned but later reopened as a commercial cargo airport. Besides serving Baikonur, Kazakh authorities also use it for passenger and charter flights from Russia.
- Site 254 – Built to service the Buran-class orbiters between flights (thus fulfilling a role similar to the OPF at KSC). Constructed in the 1980s as a special four-bay building, it also featured a large processing area flanked by several floors of test rooms. After cancellation of the Buran programme it was adapted for pre-launch operations of the Soyuz and Progress spacecraft.

=== Missions ===
==== Atmospheric test flights ====
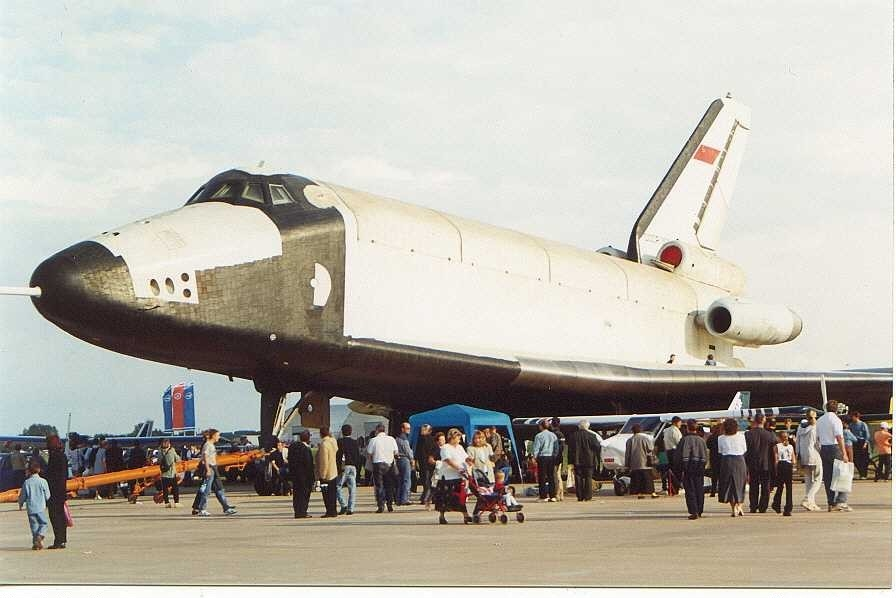
OK-GLI Buran aerodynamic analogue

An aerodynamic testbed, OK-GLI, was constructed in 1984 to test the in-flight properties of the Buran design. Unlike the American prototype Space Shuttle Enterprise, OK-GLI had four AL-31 turbofan engines fitted, meaning it was able to fly under its own power.

==== Orbital flight of Buran in 1988 ====
Following a series of atmospheric test flights using the jet-powered OK-GLI prototype, the first operational spacecraft (Buran, orbiter 1K) flew one uncrewed test mission.

At 03:00 UTC on 15 November 1988, Buran and the Energia carrier rocket lifted off from pad 110/37 in Baikonur. The life support system was not installed for the flight and no data was displayed on the CRT displays in the Command Compartment.

No	Launch Date	Mission	Shuttle	Crew	Duration	Landing Site	Notes	Sources
1	15 November 1988; 03:00:02 UTC; 06:00:02 MSK	1K1	Buran	0	3h 25m 22s	Baikonur	Only flight of Buran; Only uncrewed flight of Space Shuttle type vehicle	

The shuttle orbited the Earth twice, travelling 83,707 kilometres (52,013 mi) in 3 hours and 25 minutes (0.14 flight days). On its return, it performed an automated landing on the shuttle runway (Site 251) at Baikonur Cosmodrome.

==== Planned flights ====
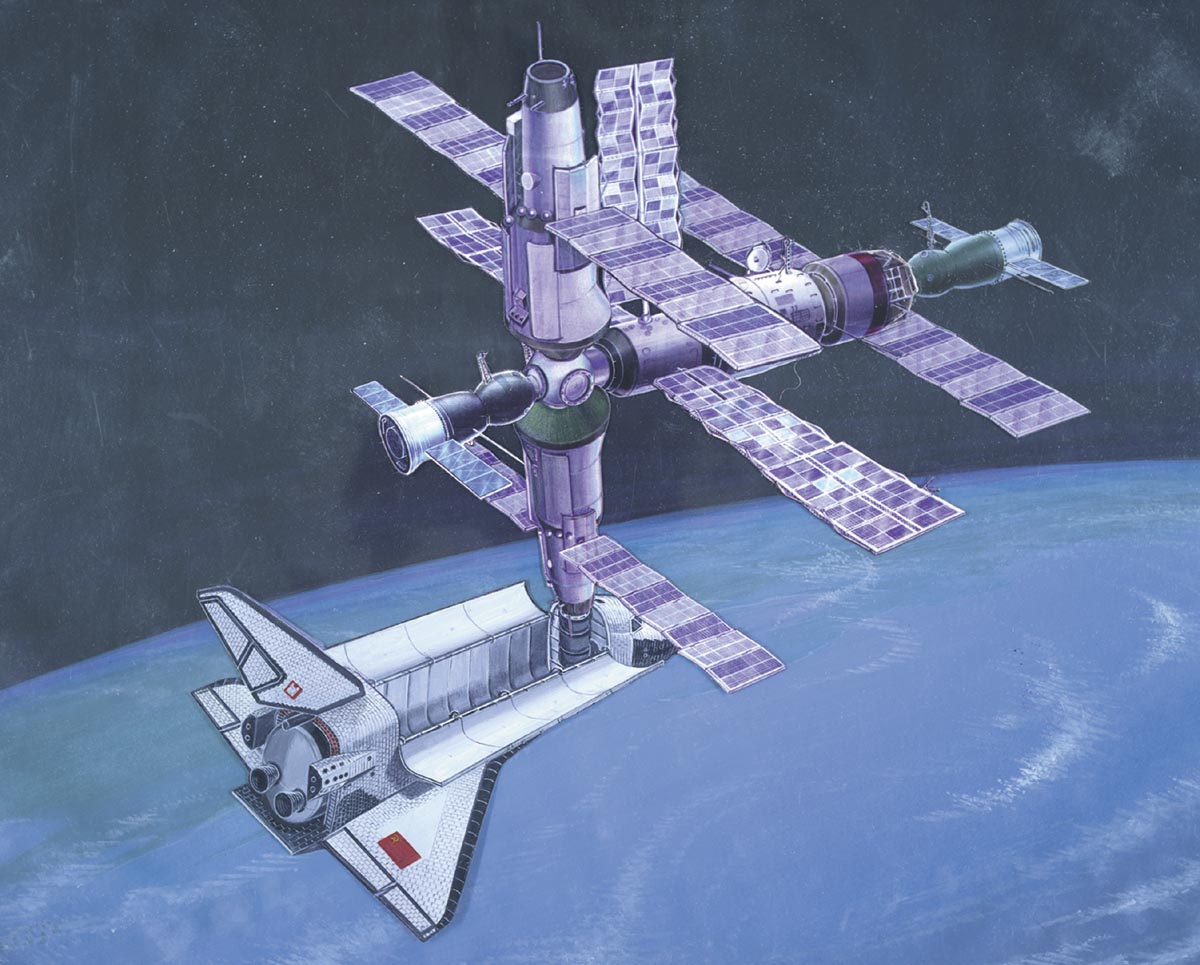
Planned Ptichka mission to Mir space station

The planned flights for the shuttles in 1989, before the downsizing of the project and eventual cancellation, were:

- 1991 — Orbiter 2K uncrewed first flight, duration 1–2 days.
- 1992 — Orbiter 2K uncrewed second flight, duration 7–8 days. Orbital manoeuvres and space station approach test.
- 1993 — Buran (1K) uncrewed second flight, duration 15–20 days.
- 1994 — Orbiter 3K first crewed space test flight, duration of 24 hours. Craft equipped with life-support system and with two ejection seats. Crew would consist of two cosmonauts with Igor Volk as commander, and a flight engineer.
- 1994–1995 — Second, third, fourth and fifth crewed orbital test flights.

The planned uncrewed second flight of orbiter 2K was changed in 1991 to the following:

- December 1991 — Orbiter 2K uncrewed second flight, with a duration of 7–8 days. Orbital maneuvers and space station approach test:
  - automatic docking with Mir's Kristall module
  - crew transfer from Mir to the orbiter, with testing of some of its systems in the course of twenty-four hours, including the remote manipulator
  - undocking and autonomous flight in orbit
  - docking of the crewed Soyuz TM-101 with orbiter 2K
  - crew transfer from the Soyuz to the orbiter and onboard work in the course of twenty-four hours
  - automatic undocking and landing

=== Cancellation of the programme 1993 ===
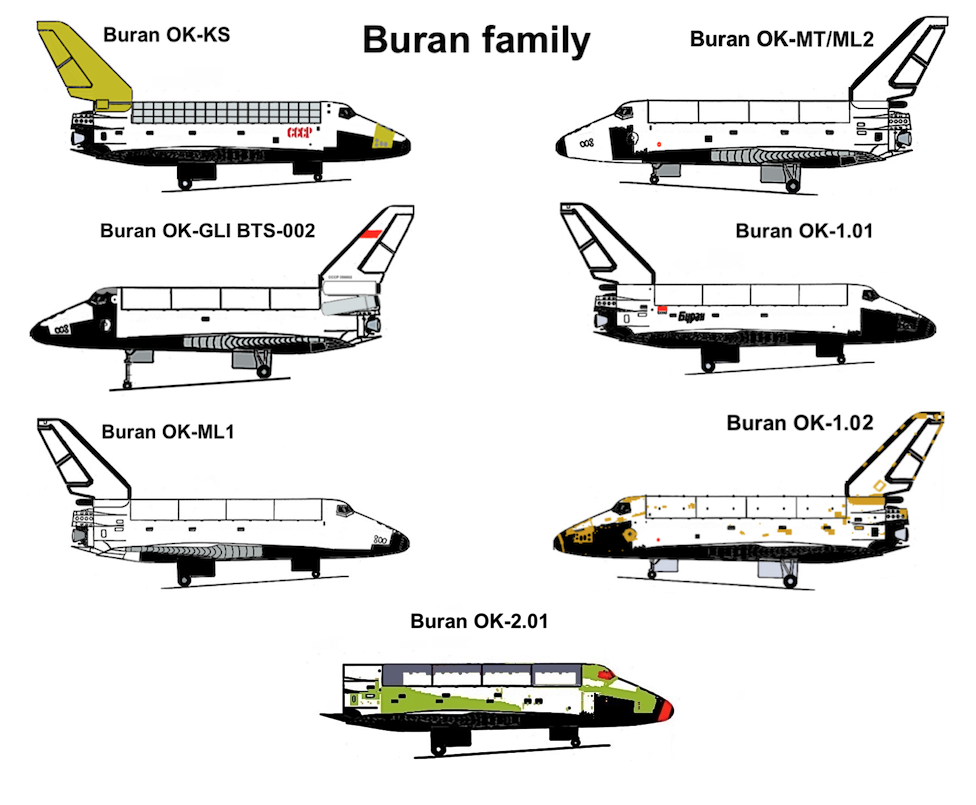
Buran family, showing test articles and orbiters in different completion stages.

After the first flight of a Buran shuttle, the project was suspended due to lack of funds and the political situation in the Soviet Union. The two subsequent orbiters, which were due in 1990 (Orbiter 2K) and 1992 (Orbiter 3K) were never completed with other articles being scrapped (see next section).

The project was officially terminated on 30 June 1993, by President Boris Yeltsin. At the time of its cancellation, 20 billion roubles had been spent on the Buran programme. Commenting on the discontinuation of the programme in his interview to New Scientist, Russian cosmonaut Oleg Kotov described the project's end:

"We had no civilian tasks for Buran and the military ones were no longer needed."

The programme was designed to boost national pride, carry out research, and meet technological objectives similar to those of the U.S. Space Shuttle programme, including resupply of the Mir space station, which was launched in 1986 and remained in service until 2001. When Mir was finally visited by a spaceplane, the visitor was a Space Shuttle orbiter, not a Buran-class orbiter.

The Buran SO, a docking module that was to be used for rendezvous with the Mir space station, was refitted for use with the U.S. Space Shuttles during the Shuttle–Mir missions.

The cost of a Buran launch carrying a 20-ton payload was estimated at 270 million roubles, vs 5.5 million roubles on the Proton rocket.

==== Baikonur hangar collapse ====
On 12 May 2002, a hangar roof at the Baikonur Cosmodrome in Kazakhstan collapsed because of a structural failure due to poor maintenance. The collapse killed eight workers and destroyed one of the orbiters (Buran, orbiter 1K), which flew the test flight in 1988, as well as a mock-up of an Energia booster rocket. It was not clear to outsiders at the time which orbiter was destroyed and the BBC reported that it was just "a model" of the orbiter. It occurred at the MIK RN/MIK 112 building at Site 112 of the Baikonur Cosmodrome, 14 years after the only Buran flight. Work on the roof had begun for a maintenance project, whose equipment is thought to have contributed to the collapse, together with heavy rainfall in the days preceding the collapse.

== List of vehicles ==
Five orbiters were planned to be built (designated 1K-5K, K stands for Корабль, 'craft, flying article'), with hull numbering starting with 1 or 2 (e.g. 1.01), two originally ordered in 1970s and three ("second series") additionally ordered in 1983.

For research and testing purposes, several test articles were produced, designated 1M-8M (M stands for Макет, 'mock-up'), with hull numbering starting with 0 (e.g. 0.02). The programme prefix OK stands for Орбитальный Корабль, 'Orbital Vehicle' and carries the GRAU index number 11F35.

By 1991 two operational vehicles were delivered to Baikonur, three others were under construction at the Tushino Machine-Building Plant (TMZ) near Moscow.

Most of the geo-locations below show the orbiter bodies on the ground; in some cases Google Earth's History facility is required to see the orbiter within the dates specified.

Name	Function	Location	Image	Geo-location	Approximate dates	Notes
Flight orbiters
Buran; 1K; 1.01	First flight article, first spaceplane series	Baikonur Cosmodrome Site 110/37 (L) at Baikonur	1988 1989	45.96486°N 63.30496°E Spaceplane not visible; no available satellite photos	15 November 1988	Built in 1986, only flightworthy orbiter. Launched on an uncrewed, remote controlled flight; two orbits and landing (with heavy crosswinds and a self-initiated approach direction change) at Yubileiniy (Jubilee) Airport, Baikonur.
Buran; 1K; 1.01	First flight article, first spaceplane series	MIK building, Baikonur Cosmodrome, Kazakhstan	2002	45.92750°N 63.29761°E Spaceplane not visible; shadows	1988 to 2002	Housed in MIK building in area 112, Baikonur with an Energia booster mockup and other Energia hardware, destroyed in a roof collapse on 12 May 2002, which killed eight workers.
2K Ptichka (Note: Only orbiter 1K, Buran, was ever officially named.); 1.02	Second flight article, first series, 95–97% complete	MIK building, Baikonur Cosmodrome, Kazakhstan		45.92836°N 63.29809°E Shuttle not visible, in building	1988 to 1995	Built in 1988, housed adjacent to Buran.
2K Ptichka; 1.02	Second flight article, first series, 95–97% complete	MZK building 80, area 112a, Baikonur	2015 2020	45.94046°N 63.31841°E Spaceplane not visible; in building	1995 to present	Often erroneously referred to as "Ptichka" or "Burya". Moved to the MZK in August 1995. Reportedly property of Russian-Kazakh company Aelita since 2005.
3K 2.01	First flight article, second series, 30–50% complete	Inside Tushino Plant, Moscow, Russia			1991 to 2006	Built 1991
3K 2.01	First flight article, second series, 30–50% complete	Car park on Kimki Reservoir, near plant	2007–2011	55.84136°N 37.46625°E; use history	2006 to 2011	Moved outdoors
3K 2.01	First flight article, second series, 30–50% complete	Zhukovsky Airport, near Moscow, Russia	2011	on 15 August 2011 55.57125°N 38.143°E; use history	2011 to present	An exhibit in the MAKS-2011 and later air shows. Zhukovsky International Airport is the site of the Gromov Flight Research Institute, and has become a large outdoor flight museum. Other sightings: on 15 March 2012: 55.56565°N 38.14491°E, on 31 July 2012 and 8 May 2013 55.56309°N 38.14714°E, on 4 June and 29 July 2014 55.55179°N 38.14463°E, on 11 September 2016 through 2020 55.57125°N 38.143°E. As of December, 2021, it has been reportedly bought by Vadim Zadorozhny, in order to be restored and displayed in UMMC Museum Complex.
4K; 2.02	Second flight article, second series, 10–20% complete	Tushino plant, Moscow, Russia			1988 to present	Build started 1988, Only forward fuselage with crew cabin was completed by the time its construction was cancelled. The right wing with landing gear produced for this orbiter was later used for OK-TVA. Some pieces of 2.02, like heat tiles, have found their way onto eBay.
5K; 2.03	Third flight article, second series, very small amount assembled			Scattered	1988 to present	Disassembled by 1995. All parts have been scattered and are unidentifiable.
Test articles
OK-M; OK-ML-1; BTS-001; 1M; 0.01	Airframe and shake test bed article	Outdoor pad, area 112, Baikonur Cosmodrome, Kazakhstan		45.91963°N 63.30996°E; use history	1988 to January 2007	Built in 1982, deteriorated considerably outdoors on pad
OK-M; OK-ML-1; BTS-001; 1M; 0.01	Airframe and shake test bed article	Gagarin Museum, Baikonur Cosmodrome, Kazakhstan	2007	45.90963°N 63.31789°E	January 2007 to present	Refurbished in 2007, now on outdoor display
OK-GLI; OK-ML-2; BTS-002; 2M; 0.02	Atmospheric test article, two extra jet engines in rear to facilitate take-off	Ramenskoye Airport, Moscow		55.5631°N 38.14716°E; no history available this far back	1999	Built in 1984, used in 25 test flights. On display at MAKS-1999, Russia's most prestigious airshow.
OK-GLI; OK-ML-2; BTS-002; 2M; 0.02	Atmospheric test article, two extra jet engines in rear to facilitate take-off	Darling Island, Sydney harbour, Australia	2000 2002	33.86392°S 151.19662°E; use history to see shelter, shuttle not visible	February 2000 to September 2000; afterwards stored on the site until about Oct 2002	Sold and sent in February 2000 to the Sydney, Australia 2000 Olympic Games. Displayed inside a light structure, stored outdoors there afterwards.
OK-GLI; OK-ML-2; BTS-002; 2M; 0.02	Atmospheric test article, two extra jet engines in rear to facilitate take-off	Manama harbour, Bahrain		26.19826°N 50.60243°E; use history	July 2004 to 2007	Stored outdoors in Bahrain while the ownership of the spaceplane was legally contested.
OK-GLI; OK-ML-2; BTS-002; 2M; 0.02	Atmospheric test article, two extra jet engines in rear to facilitate take-off	Technik Museum, Speyer, Germany	2008	49.31185°N 8.44628°E; shuttle not visible, in building	2008 to present	Purchased from Roscosmos State Corporation when it won the legal battle, displayed indoors.
OK-KS; 3M; 0.03	Electrical test article	Checkout and Test Building (KIS), RKK Energia Plant, Korolev, Russia		55.92132°N 37.79929°E; not visible, in building. This location shows a half-scale memorial of Energia and the Buran, perhaps meant to be replaced.	2006 to 15 October 2012	Built in 1982, stored inside
OK-KS; 3M; 0.03	Electrical test article	Grounds of the RKK Energia plant		55.91685°N 37.79937°E	15 October 2012 to June 2017	Stored outside by 15 October 2012, intended to be placed on permanent display.
OK-KS; 3M; 0.03	Electrical test article	Sirius Science Center, Sochi, Krasnodar Krai, Russia	2018	43.414442°N 39.949115°E	June 2017 to current	On permanent outdoor display at the Sirius Science Center in Sochi, Russia.
OK-MT; 4M; 0.04	Engineering mockup	MZK building, Baikonur Cosmodrome, Kazakhstan	2014 2020	45.94046°N 63.31841°E; vehicle not visible, in building	1988 to present	Built in 1983. Moved to the MZK in August 1995.
5M; 0.05	Environmental test parts from forward fuselage			Unknown	1988 to present	Destroyed, parts used for OK-TVA.
OK-TVI; 6M; 0.06	Environmental test article	NIIKhimMash rocket test area, near Moscow, Russia			1988 to present	
OK-TVA; 7M; 0.15	Structural test article	Gorky Park, Moscow, Russia	2010	55.72876°N 37.59688°E; use history	1995 to July 2014	Served as an attraction, a small restaurant, and bicycle storage, as part of the now-defunct amusement park at that site.
OK-TVA; 7M; 0.15	Structural test article	Outside Pavilion 20 about 250 meters south of the Vostok rocket, VDNKh/VVT (All-Russia Exhibition Center)	2014	55.83219°N 37.62291°E; use history	July 2014 to present	Moved to VDNKh on 5 July 2014, assembled by 21 July. The shuttle acquisition is part of the VDNKh refurbishment.
8M; 0.08	Components used for static thermal and vacuum tests	Outdoor display at Clinical Hospital No. 83 FMBA on Orekhovy Boulevard in Moscow	2012	55.618°N 37.76448°E	from 24 April 2011 to present	
Unnamed	Wooden wind tunnel model, 1/3 scale	Ramenskoye Airport, near Moscow, Russia, photographed in 2013	2013		up to 2013	Has been destroyed in or after 2013. Photographed at Zhukovsky International Airport by Aleksander Makin.

=== Related test vehicles and models ===
Name	Function	Image	Construction date	Current status
BOR-4	Sub-scale model of the Spiral space plane		1982–1984	1:2 scale model of Spiral space plane. 5 launches. NPO Molniya, Moscow.
BOR-5 ("Kosmos")	Suborbital test of 1/8 scale model of Buran		1983–1988	5 launches, none were reflown but at least 4 were recovered. NPO Molniya, Moscow.
Wind tunnel models	Scales from 1:3 to 1:550			85 models built; see unnamed test article in table above.
Gas dynamics models	Scales from 1:15 to 1:2700			

== Revival possibilities ==
Over time, several scientists looked into trying to revive the Buran programme, especially after the Space Shuttle Columbia disaster.

The 2003 grounding of the U.S. Space Shuttles caused many to wonder whether the Energia launcher or Buran shuttle could be brought back into service. By then, however, all of the equipment for both (including the vehicles themselves) had fallen into disrepair or been repurposed after falling into disuse with the collapse of the Soviet Union.

In 2010 the director of Moscow's Central Machine Building Institute said the Buran programme would be reviewed in the hope of restarting a similar crewed spacecraft design, with rocket test launches as soon as 2015. Russia also continues work on the PPTS but has abandoned the Kliper program, due to differences in vision with its European partners.

Due to the 2011 retirement of the American Space Shuttle and the need for STS-type craft in the meantime to complete the International Space Station, some American and Russian scientists had been mulling over plans to possibly revive the already-existing Buran shuttles in the Buran programme rather than spend money on an entirely new craft and wait for it to be fully developed but the plans did not come to fruition.

On the 25th anniversary of the Buran flight in November 2013, Oleg Ostapenko, the new head of Roscosmos, the Russian Federal Space Agency, proposed that a new heavy-lift launch vehicle be built for the Russian space programme. The rocket would be intended to place a payload of 100 tonnes (220,000 lb) in a baseline low Earth orbit and is projected to be based on the Angara launch vehicle technology.

== Vehicles ==
=== Energia launch vehicle ===
Energia (Russian: Энергия, romanized: Energiya, lit. 'Energy'; GRAU: 11K25, Sheldon: K-1, DoD: SL-17) was a 1980s super-heavy lift launch vehicle. It was designed by NPO Energia of the Soviet Union as part of the Buran programme for a variety of payloads including the Buran spacecraft. The Energia used four strap-on boosters, each powered by a four-chamber RD-170 engine burning kerosene/LOX, and a central core stage with four single-chamber RD-0120 (11D122) engines fueled by liquid hydrogen/LOX.

The Energia vehicle had two functionally different operational variants: Energia-Buran, in which a Buran-class orbiter was the payload and performed the final orbital insertion, and Buran-T, in which the payload was carried in a side-mounted cargo container and final insertion was performed either by the payload, an upper stage, or a space tug integrated into the container. During the first launch of the Energia, the vehicle carried the Polyus spacecraft in place of the cargo container; the operational Buran-T configuration with a container was never flown.

The launch vehicle had the capacity to place about 100 tonnes in Low Earth orbit, up to 20 tonnes to geostationary orbit and up to 32 tonnes by translunar trajectory into lunar orbit. The program was officially approved in 1976, following the cancellation of the unsuccessful N1 rocket designed for Soviet crewed lunar missions. Energia was the Soviet Union's first successful super-heavy lift launch vehicle, and the world's second, after the American Saturn V.

The Energia made just two flights before being discontinued, carrying Polyus in 1987 and the Buran orbiter in 1988. The RD-170 engine used on the vehicle's strap-on boosters was at the time the most powerful rocket engine to use liquid fuel, and scaled-down versions of the RD-170 have been used on a number of launch vehicles, with a dual-chamber derivative on the American Atlas III and Atlas V, and single-chamber derivatives on the Russian Angara rockets, the American Antares 200, and South Korean Naro-1.

=== Buran orbiter ===
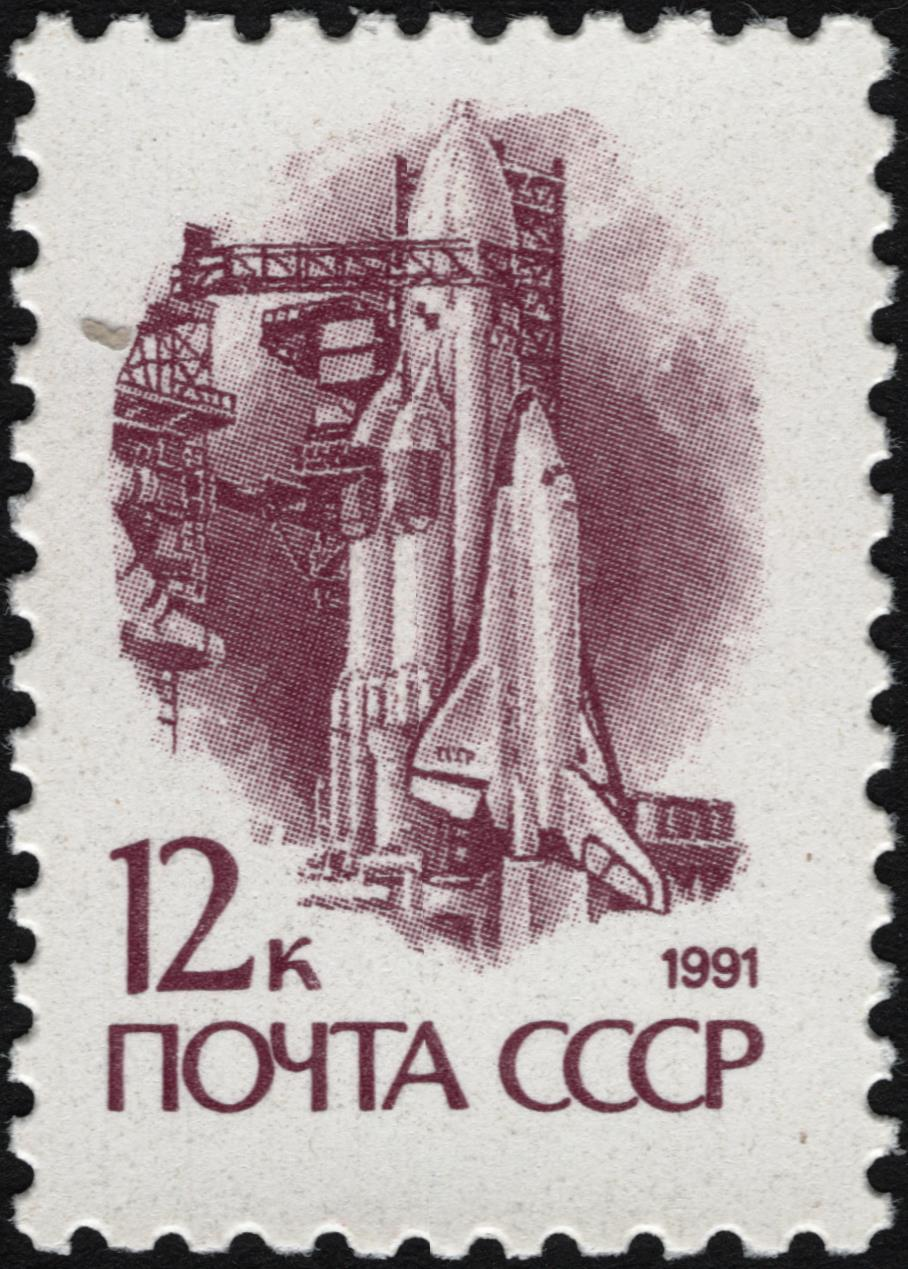
Buran on a Soviet stamp, with an Energia rocket.

Buran (Russian: Буран, IPA: [bʊˈran], lit. 'blizzard'; GRAU: 11F35 1K, construction number: 1.01, DoD: RAM-R) was the first flight orbiter to be produced as part of the Soviet/Russian Buran programme. The Buran orbiters were similar in design to the U.S. Space Shuttle. Buran completed one uncrewed spaceflight in 1988, and was destroyed in 2002 when the roof of its storage hangar collapsed at Baikonur Cosmodrome.

The Buran orbiters used the expendable Energia rocket, a class of super heavy-lift launch vehicle. Besides describing the first operational Soviet/Russian shuttle orbiter, "Buran" was also the designation for the entire Soviet/Russian spaceplane project and its flight articles, which were known as "Buran-class orbiters".

=== Antonov An-225 Mriya ===
The Antonov An-225 Mriya (Ukrainian: Антонов Ан-225 Мрія meaning dream; NATO reporting name: Cossack) was a large strategic airlift cargo aircraft designed and produced by the Antonov Design Bureau in the Soviet Union.

It was originally developed during the 1980s as an enlarged derivative of the Antonov An-124 airlifter for transporting Buran-class orbiters. On 21 December 1988, the An-225 performed its maiden flight; only one aircraft was ever completed, although a second airframe with a slightly different configuration was partially built. After a brief period of use in the Soviet space program, the aircraft was mothballed during the early 1990s. Towards the turn of the century, it was decided to refurbish the An-225 and reintroduce it for commercial operations, carrying oversized payloads for the operator Antonov Airlines. Multiple announcements were made regarding the potential completion of the second airframe, though its construction largely remained on hold due to a lack of funding. By 2009, it had reportedly been brought up to 60–70% completion.

With a maximum takeoff weight of 640 tonnes (705 short tons), the An-225 held several records, including heaviest aircraft ever built and largest wingspan of any operational aircraft. It was commonly used to transport objects once thought impossible to move by air, such as 130-ton generators, wind turbine blades, and diesel locomotives. Additionally, both Chinese and Russian officials had announced separate plans to adapt the An-225 for use in their respective space programs. The Mriya routinely attracted a high degree of public interest, attaining a global following due to its size and its uniqueness.

The only completed An-225 was destroyed in the Battle of Antonov Airport during the 2022 Russian invasion of Ukraine. In 2022, Ukrainian president Volodymyr Zelenskyy announced plans to complete the second An-225 to replace the destroyed aircraft.

=== Energia liquid rocket booster ===
Zenit (Ukrainian: Зеніт, Russian: Зени́т; meaning Zenith) was a family of space launch vehicles designed by the Yuzhnoye Design Bureau in Dnipro, Ukraine, which was then part of the Soviet Union. Zenit was originally built in the 1980s for two purposes: as a liquid rocket booster for the Energia rocket and, equipped with a second stage, as a stand-alone middle-weight launcher with a payload greater than the 7 tonnes of the Soyuz but smaller than the 20 tonnes payload of the Proton. The last rocket family developed in the USSR, the Zenit was intended as an eventual replacement for the dated Soyuz and Proton families, and it would employ propellants which were safer and less toxic than the Proton's nitrogen tetroxide/UDMH mix. Zenit was planned to take over crewed spaceship launches from Soyuz, but these plans were abandoned after the dissolution of the Soviet Union in 1991.

Many of components of the Zenit rockets were produced in Russia. The Ukrainian space industry was highly integrated with that of Russia due to its Soviet heritage, but that cooperation was interrupted by the Russo-Ukrainian War beginning in 2014, which has effectively led to a hiatus in the Zenit program. The subsequent Russian invasion of Ukraine in 2022 saw damage to its manufacturing facilities due to Russian missile strikes, and what survived those strikes pivoted to producing military weapons.

Zenit-3SL was launched by the Sea Launch consortium's floating launch platform in the Pacific Ocean and Zenit-2 was launched from Baikonur Cosmodrome in Kazakhstan. RD-171M engines of the Zenit's first and second stages as well as the upper stage of the Zenit-3SL rocket were supplied by Russia. An improved Zenit-3SLB rocket was used for commercial launches from Baikonur Cosmodrome beginning in April 2008, marketed as Land Launch.

Zenit-3SL was launched 36 times with 32 successes, one partial success, and three failures. The first failure, the launch of a Hughes-built communications satellite owned by ICO Global Communications, occurred during the second commercial launch on March 12, 2000, and was blamed on a software error that failed to close a valve in the second stage of the rocket. The second failure occurred on January 30, 2007, when the rocket exploded on the Odyssey launch platform, seconds after engine ignition. The NSS-8 communication satellite on board was destroyed.

On September 24, 2011 Zenit-3SL launched successfully from the Odyssey launch platform under a renewed Sea Launch project with RSC Energia as the majority stakeholder. The rocket delivered the European communication satellite Atlantic Bird 7 to its planned orbit. On February 1, 2013, another Zenit-3SL failed while launching the Intelsat 27 satellite.

== Energia-Buran and the US Space Shuttle ==
Comparison between Soyuz, Space Shuttle, and Energia-Buran

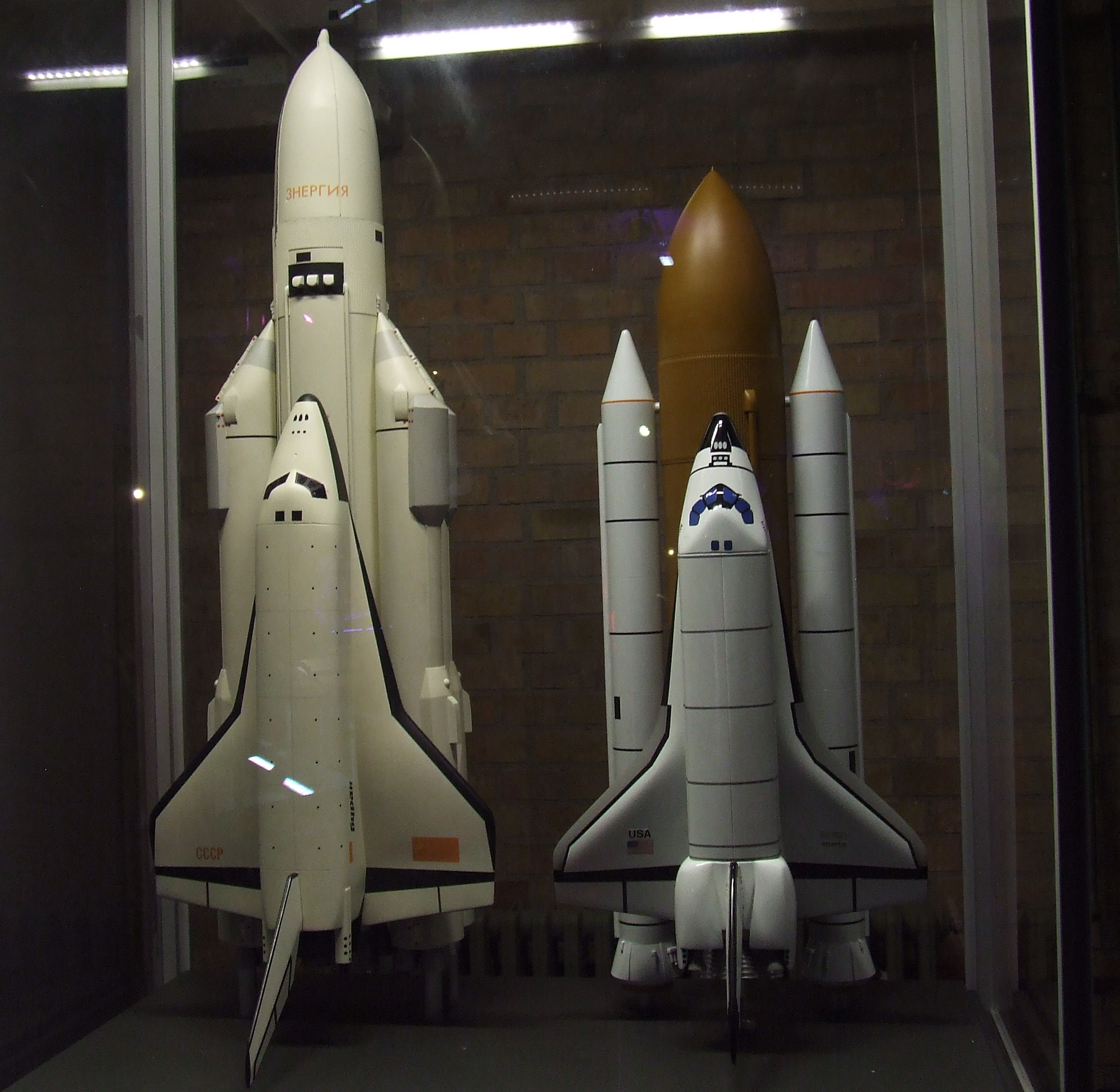
Comparison to Space Shuttle

=== Comparison to NASA's Space Shuttle ===
Because Buran's debut followed that of Space Shuttle Columbia's, and because there were striking visual similarities between the two shuttle systems—a state of affairs which recalled the similarity between the Tupolev Tu-144 and Concorde supersonic airliners—many speculated that Cold War espionage played a role in the development of the Soviet shuttle. Despite remarkable external similarities, many key differences existed, which suggests that, had espionage been a factor in Buran's development, it would likely have been in the form of external photography or early airframe designs. NASA Administrator James C. Fletcher stated that Buran was based on a rejected NASA design.

=== Key differences between Energia-Buran system and NASA's Space Shuttle ===
- Unlike the Space Shuttle's boosters, each of Energia's four boosters had their own guidance, navigation, and control system. Known as Zenit-2, they were used as launch vehicles on their own to deliver smaller payloads than those requiring the complete Energia-Buran system. Space Shuttle boosters each had their own guidance and control system, but all navigation functions were centrally located in the shuttle orbiter; the autonomous guidance functions of the boosters were therefore more limited, primarily oriented to safe separation from the external tank and orbiter during staging after booster fuel exhaustion.
- Energia could be configured with four, two or no boosters for payloads other than Buran, and in full configuration was able to put up to 100 metric tons into orbit. The Space Shuttle orbiter was integral to its launch system and was the system's only payload.
- Energia's four boosters used liquid propellant (kerosene/oxygen). The Space Shuttle's two boosters used solid propellant.
- The liquid fuelled booster rockets were not constructed in segments vulnerable to leakage through O-rings, which caused the destruction of Challenger.
- Energia's four boosters were designed to be recovered after each flight, though they were not recovered during Energia's two operational flights. The Space Shuttle's boosters were recovered and reused.
- Buran's equivalent of the Space Shuttle Orbital Maneuvering System used GOX/LOX/Kerosene propellant, with lower toxicity and higher performance (a specific impulse of 362 seconds (3.55 km/s) using a turbopump system) than the Shuttle's pressure-fed monomethylhydrazine/dinitrogen tetroxide OMS engines.
- Buran was designed to be capable of both piloted and fully autonomous flight, including landing. The Space Shuttle was later retrofitted with remote control functions extending its existing crewed automated landing capability to enable uncrewed landings, first flown 18 years after the Buran on STS-121, but the system was intended to be used only in contingencies.
- The nose landing gear was located much farther back on the fuselage rather than just under the mid-deck as with the NASA Space Shuttle.
- Buran was designed to lift 30 metric tons into orbit in its standard configuration, comparable to the early Space Shuttle's original 27.8 metric tons.
- Buran could return 20 tons from orbit, vs the Space Shuttle's 15 tons.
- Buran included a drag chute; the Space Shuttle originally did not, but was later retrofitted to include one.
- The lift-to-drag ratio of Buran is cited as 5.6, compared to a subsonic L/D of 4.5 for the Space Shuttle.
- Buran and Energia were moved to the launch pad horizontally on a rail transporter, and then erected and fuelled at the launch site. The Space Shuttle was transported vertically on the crawler-transporter with loaded solid boosters but the main tank was fuelled at launch site.
- Buran was intended to carry a crew of up to ten. The Shuttle carried up to eight in the largest crewed mission, normally carried between five and seven people in most missions, and could have carried up to eleven in an emergency (such as in the unlaunched STS-400 rescue mission).
- Buran has a different thermal protection tile layout on its underside, in which all gaps between heat tiles are parallel or perpendicular to the direction of airflow around the orbiter.

== See also ==
- MAKS (spacecraft) – Soviet air-launched spaceplane concept
- Mikoyan-Gurevich MiG-105 – Soviet spaceplane test programme
- Space Shuttle programme – American spaceplane
- Tupolev OOS – Soviet air-launched spaceplane concept

== Bibliography ==
- Hendrickx, Bart & Vis, Bert (4 October 2007). Energiya-Buran: The Soviet Space Shuttle. Springer-Praxis. doi:10.1007/978-0-387-73984-7. ISBN 978-0-387-69848-9.
