= 2.01 (Buran-class spacecraft) =

Reusable launch system

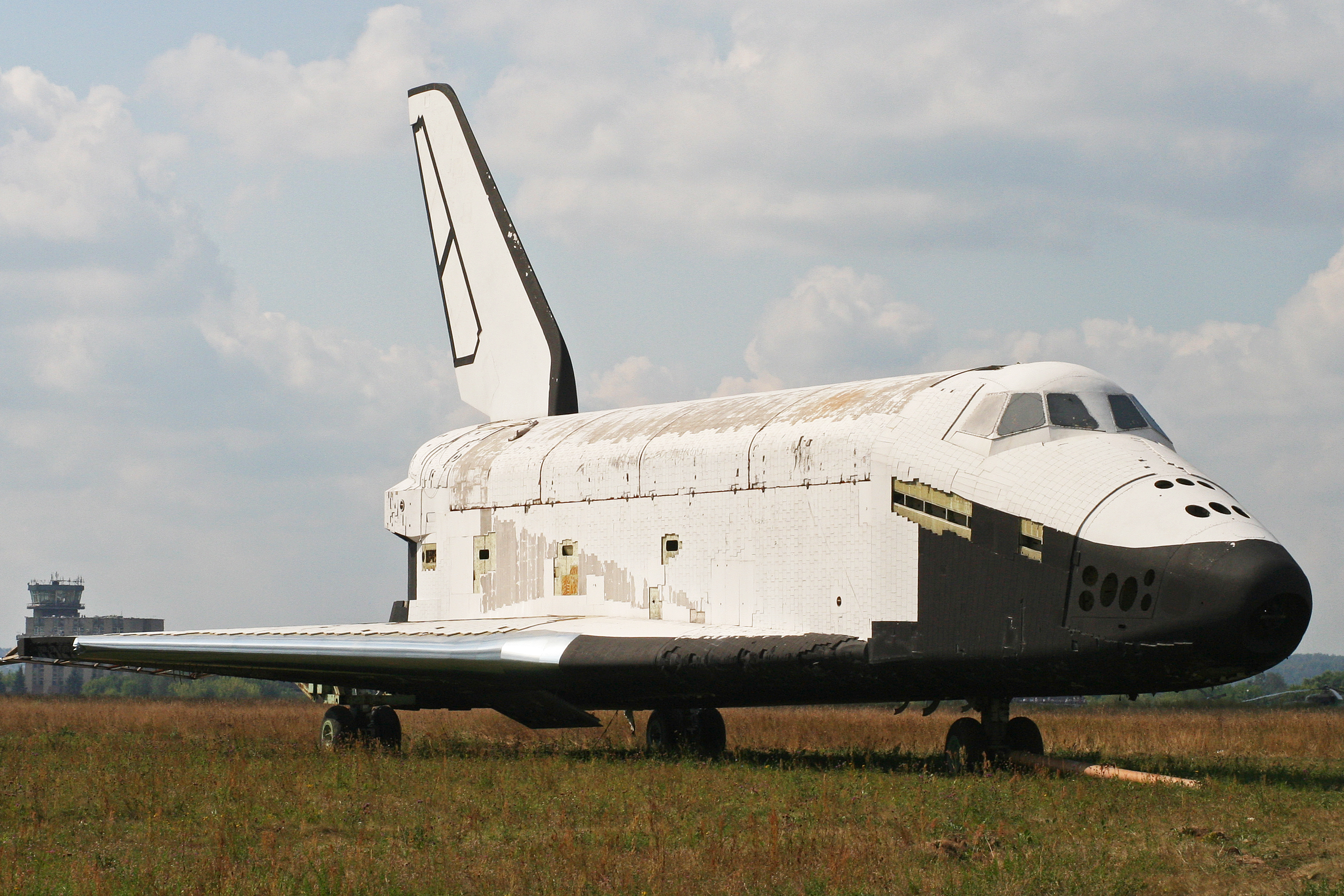
- 2.01 in 2012
- Type: Buran-class orbiter
- Country: Soviet Union
- Contract award: 1983
- Status: Unfinished

2.01 (GRAU index serial number 11F35 3K) is the designation of the third Buran-class orbiter to be produced as part of the Soviet/Russian Buran programme. Its construction was not complete when the Buran programme was cancelled (30–50 percent done), so it remains unfinished. It was never officially named, though it's often referred to as Baikal (Russian: Байкал) after Lake Baikal.

The orbiter is now on display at the Museum of Military and Automotive Equipment (UMMC) in Verkhnyaya Pyshma.

== Differences from Buran and Ptichka ==
The 2.01 is the first of a second series of Buran-class orbiters. The design was improved based on lessons learned from the flight of Buran and the construction of Ptichka.

Major changes include:

- Hull design optimized to save weight.
- Thermal protection system arrangement changed.
- Spoilers added to elevons.
- OMS thrusters configuration changed.
- Payload bay doors radiator design simplified.
- Landing gear improved.
- Drag chute container was reduced, since it turned out the surface area of the parachutes in the flight of Buran was overabundant.

After the Challenger disaster, it was decided to limit the crew capacity of the second series of orbiters to four crew members with ejection seats regularly mounted.

Since none of the second series orbiters were completed, only changes in the thermal protection system and OMS thrusters arrangement can be visible on 2.01.

== History ==
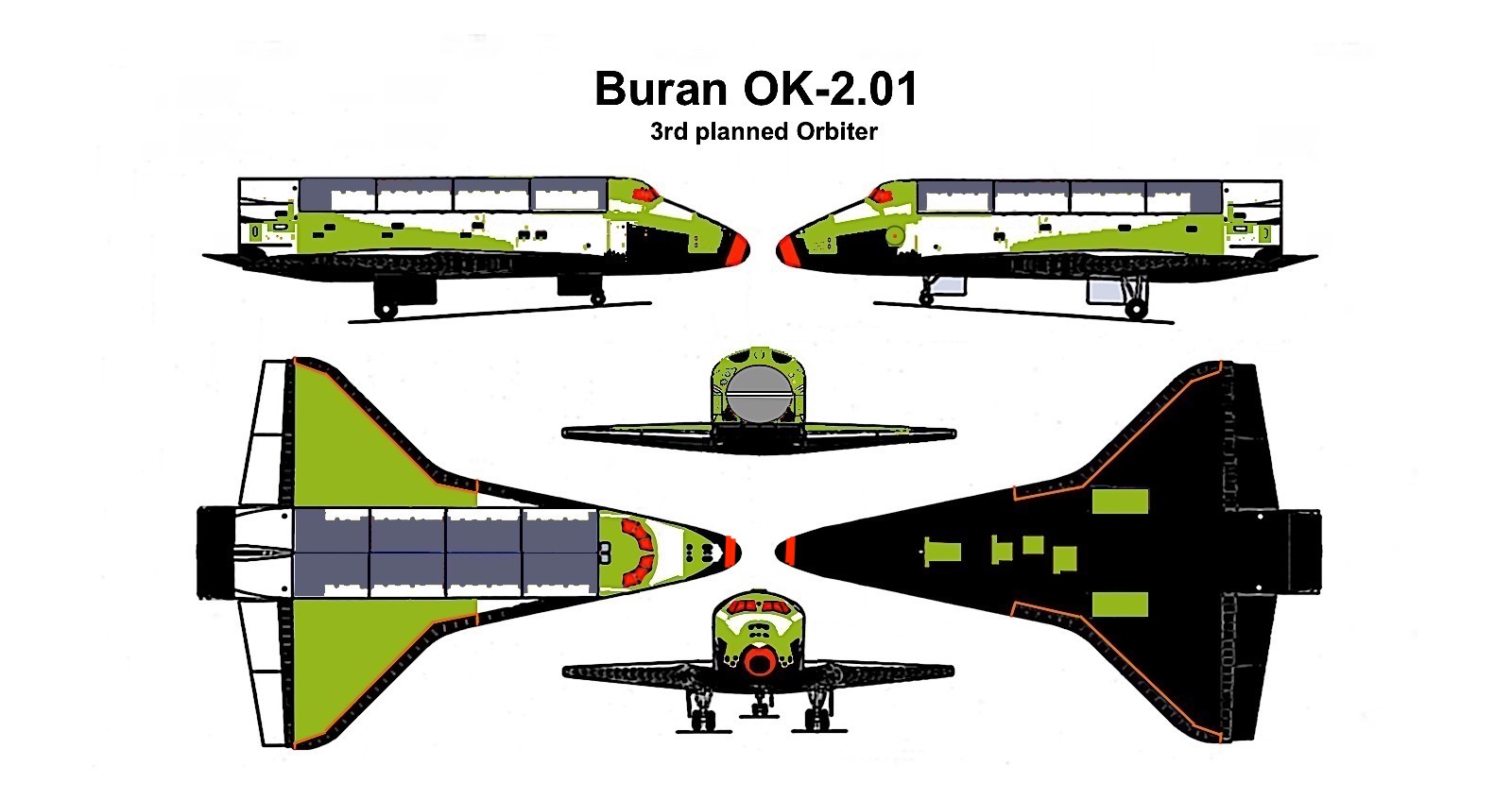
Buran flight test Orbiter OK-2.01

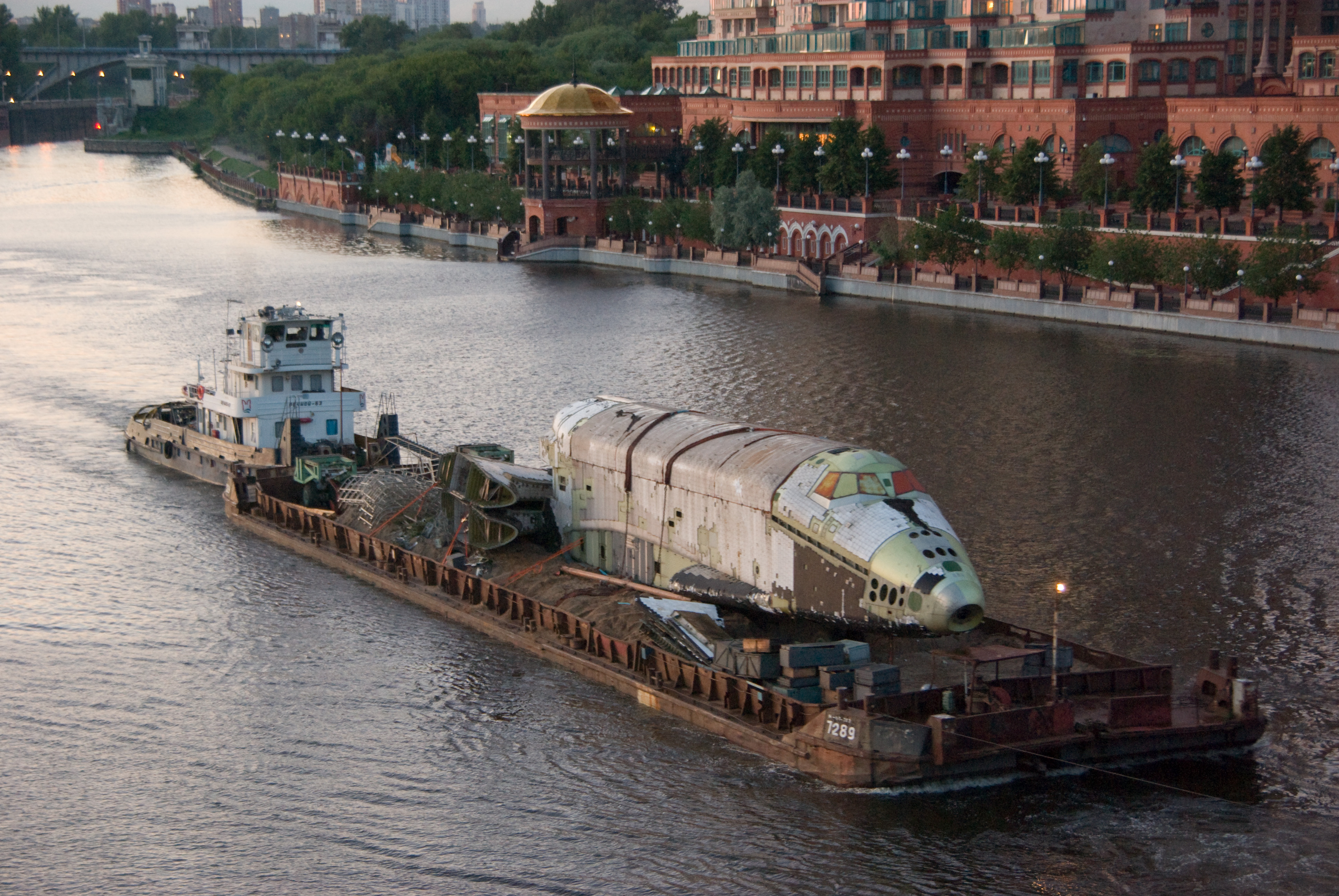
Body of 2.01 being towed by barge to Zhukovsky Airfield, 2011

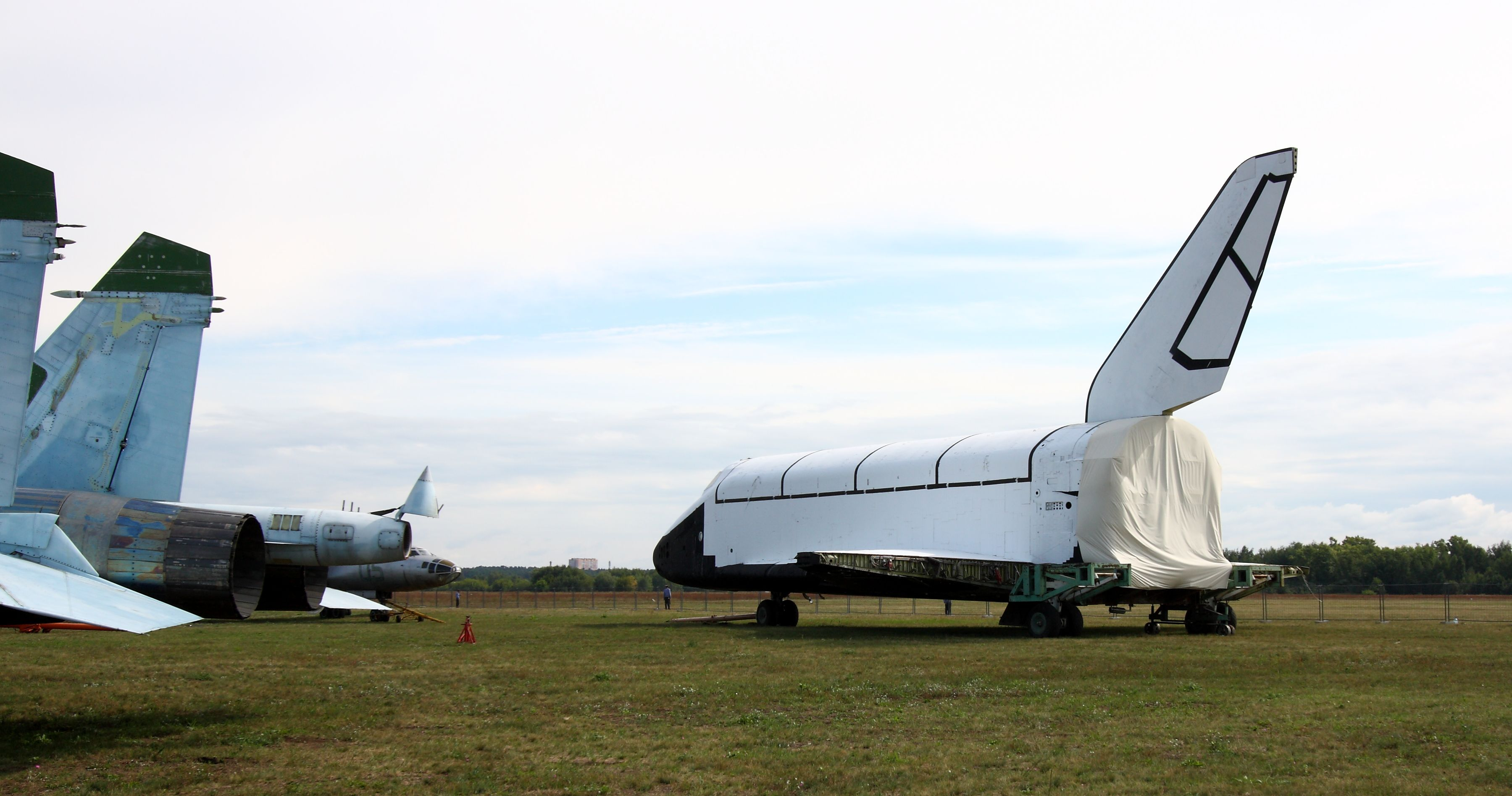
Buran 2.01 in Gromov Flight Research Institute in process of restoration, 2011

Buran 2.01 at the Voenfilm-medyn cinema complex, August 2022

=== Projected flights ===
It was projected in 1989 that orbiter 2.01 would have its first crewed space test flight, 3K1, in 1994, with a duration of twenty-four hours. The craft would have been equipped with a life support system and two ejection seats. Crew would have consisted of two cosmonauts — Igor Volk (commander) and Aleksandr Ivanchenkov (flight engineer).

In 1991, construction of the orbiter was suspended, and in 1993, the Buran program was completely cancelled.

=== Post-retirement ===
It was incorrectly announced in 2006 that orbiter 2.01 would be put on display in the Technik Museum Speyer, Germany. In actuality, the German Museum had bought OK-GLI, the jet-powered Buran atmospheric test vehicle, which appeared on display in its own new hangar from September 2008.

From 2004, the orbiter 2.01 was left under open skies at a car park in Moscow, near Khimki Reservoir.

On 22 June 2011, the orbiter was put on a barge to be moved to the MAKS 2011 international air show, which took place from 16 to 21 August in Zhukovsky (Moscow region). In the night of 22–23 June, it was seen on the Moskva River. The orbiter was exposed at the show with one side painted.

In July 2017, heat-tiles from orbiter 2.01 were listed online, leading some to believe that the orbiter had been scrapped or otherwise disassembled. However, satellite imagery of Zhukovsky Airport taken in 2019 indicates that 2.01 still resided at the airfield, although in a different location (55°34′16″N 38°8′34″E).

As of 22 April 2022, the orbiter had been moved to Voenfilm-Medyn cinema complex in Moscow Oblast, where it resided at least through August 2022. Some of the heat-tiles removed in 2017 were missing, and the coordinates for the orbiter were 54,9504486, 35,8559756.

As of April 2024, the orbiter was relocated for restoration at the Technical Museum of Vadim Zadorozhny in Moscow. In August 2024, the orbiter was acquired for display in UMMC Museum Complex. The orbiter arrived at the museum complex near Yekaterinburg in November 2024.

== See also ==
- Buran (spacecraft) – Buran Spacecraft OK-1.01
- Buran program
- OK-GLI – Buran Analog BST-02 test vehicle
- Mikoyan-Gurevich MiG-105 – Soviet orbital spaceplane
- Space Shuttle program (United States)
- MAKS (spacecraft)
- Space exploration
- Space accidents and incidents
- N1 (rocket)
- Tupolev OOS
