= 2.03 (Buran-class spacecraft) =

Reusable launch system

- Type: Buran-class orbiter
- Construction number: 5K
- Country: Soviet Union
- Contract award: 1983
- Status: Dismantled

2.03 (GRAU index serial number 11F35 5K) is the designation of the fifth Soviet/Russian Buran-class orbiter to be produced as part of the Buran programme. It was never officially named.

2.03 was a second series shuttle orbiter, as shown by the '2' in its number. Construction of 2.03 was barely underway when the entire Buran programme was halted in 1993, the parts of it that had been built were dismantled shortly afterwards. Nothing remained of it by 1995.

== See also ==
- Mikoyan-Gurevich MiG-105 — Soviet orbital spaceplane
- Spaceplane
- Spacecraft
