= 2.02 (Buran-class spacecraft) =

Reusable launch system

- Type: Buran-class orbiter
- Construction number: 4K
- Country: Soviet Union
- Contract award: 1983
- Status: Dismantled

2.02 (GRAU index serial number 11F35 4K) is the designation of the fourth built Soviet/Russian Buran-class orbiter to be produced as part of the Buran programme.

== History ==
Construction of 2.02 is believed to have begun in 1988. The spacecraft belongs to the second series of orbiters, whose design has been improved based on the experiences gained during the manufacturing and flight testing of first series orbiters.

By 1993, when the Buran program was cancelled, orbiter 2.02 was in an early stage of construction (10-20 percent). Only forward fuselage with crew cabin was completed. The incomplete 2.02 was later partially dismantled at its construction site and moved to the outside of the Tushino Machine Building Plant, near Moscow.

The right wing with landing gear produced for this orbiter, along with the left wing of article 0.05 and the fuselage of article 0.11 form a model of the Buran orbiter currently on display at VDNKh.

Some of the tiles from orbiter 2.02 were sold and auctioned on the Internet.

== See also ==
- Buran programme
- Spaceplane
