= Gleb Lozino-Lozinskiy =

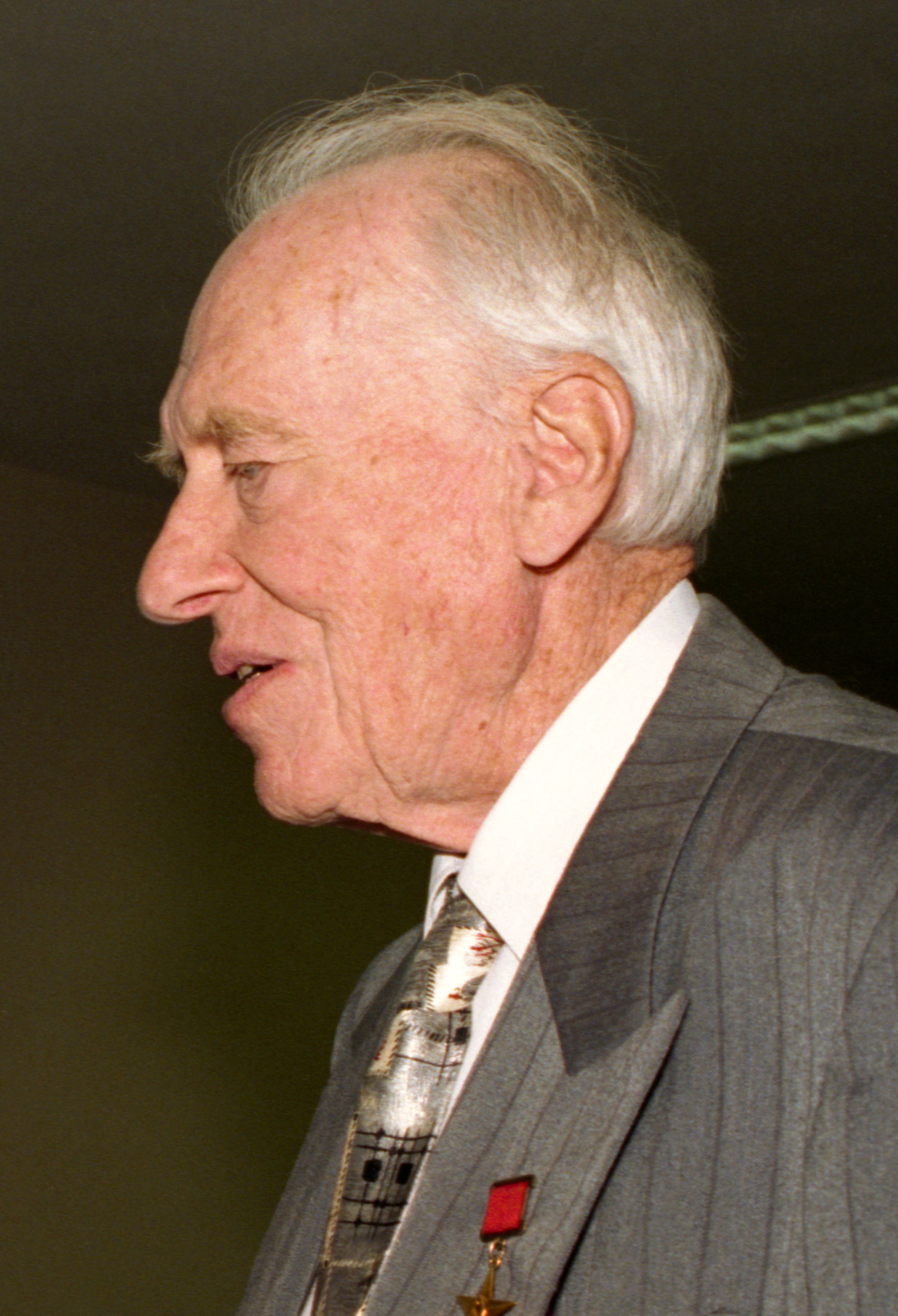
September 1997

Gleb Yevgenyevich Lozino-Lozinskiy (Russian: Глеб Евгеньевич Лозино-Лозинский; Kyiv, January 7, 1910 – Moscow, November 28, 2001) was a Ukrainian engineer, General Director and General Designer of the JSC NPO Molniya, lead developer of the Russian Spiral and Shuttle Buran programme, Doctor of Sciences, Hero of Socialist Labour, laureate of Lenin Prize (1962) and Stalin Prizes (1950, 1952).

== Biography ==
Born in Kyiv, Gleb moved with his family to Kremenchuk where he received his early education in and graduated from Kremenchuk technical high school as a plumber. He later enrolled in 1926 and graduated from the Kharkiv Mechanical and Machine-building Institute in 1930 as an engineer specializing in steam turbines. Initially he worked at a power station but in 1932 transferred to work in the aviation industry where he was involved in the development of jet turbines.

In 1939 he moved to Leningrad and in 1941 return to Ukraine to work in Kyiv. During the war he was evacuated to Kuybishev and in 1942 settled in Moscow where he joined a design bureau led by Artem Mikoyan, the developer of the Soviet fighter aircraft known around the world as MIGs. Lozino-Lozinskiy led the work on the first Soviet jet engine with an adjustable nozzle and was responsible for the production of several generations of MIG fighter jets.

In 1965, Lozino-Lozinskiy led a top-secret project named Spiral (ru) which was an early Soviet attempt to develop a small crewed space plane similar to the American X-15 project. It was planned to be launched on the back of a hypersonic aircraft, itself capable of reaching Mach 6. After separation from the carrier aircraft, the Spiral would have been boosted into orbit by a detachable rocket stage.

Although several prototypes of the Spiral space plane were built and tested in atmospheric flights, the program was terminated.

In 1976, Lozino-Lozinskiy was put in charge of NPO Molniya, a newly created design centre on the outskirts of Moscow. The organization had the unprecedented task of developing a 100-ton reusable orbiter with capabilities similar to or exceeding those of the US Space Shuttle. Unlike the US Shuttle, the Soviet winged orbiter would ride into orbit on a super-heavy booster developed separately at NPO Energia. Known as Buran, the Soviet shuttle made a single uncrewed orbital flight and completed the world's first automated landing in 1988. With the collapse of the Soviet Union in 1991, the Buran program was cancelled due to lack of funds.

Lozino-Lozinskiy led NPO Molniya in the search for the development of lightweight airplanes, aimed at reducing the cost of launching commercial payloads into space.

A small reusable space plane, developed under Lozino-Lozinskiy's leadership during the 1990s, was designed for launch on top of the giant Antonov An-225 Mriya aircraft, known as MAKS, or Multi-purpose Reusable Aerospace System.

Lozino-Lozinskiy died on November 28, 2001, at the age of 91.
