= Tupolev OOS =

Soviet concept for an air-launched, single-stage-to-orbit spaceplane

OOS ООС
- Country: Soviet Union
- Contract award: Tupolev
- Named after: Odnostupenchati Orbitalni Samolyot ("One-stage Orbital Plane")
- Status: Canceled
- No. of missions: 0
- Crew members: 0

The Tupolev OOS was a Soviet concept for an air-launched, single-stage-to-orbit spaceplane. The OOS's proposed carrier aircraft, the Antonov AKS, was a twin-fuselage concept plane consisting of two An-225 fuselages and was powered by 18 Progress D-18T turbofan engines, with the placements of the engines both above and below the wings. The OOS was to be carried under the AKS's raised center wing. The launch system was proposed in the late 1980s, but never developed past the design stage.

== See also ==
- Buran programme
- Scaled Composites Stratolaunch
- Conroy Virtus
