= Anatoly Levchenko =

Soviet cosmonaut (1941–1988)

- Анатолий Левченко; Анатолій Левченко
- Levchenko in 1987
- Born: May 5, 1941; Krasnokutsk, Ukrainian SSR, Soviet Union
- Died: 6 August 1988 (aged 47); Moscow, Russian SFSR, Soviet Union
- Occupation: Test Pilot
- Awards: Hero of the Soviet Union
- Space career

Cosmonaut
- Rank: Captain, Soviet Air Force
- Time in space: 7d 21h 58m
- Selection: 1988 Cosmonaut Group
- Mission: Mir LII-1 (Soyuz TM-4 / Soyuz TM-3)

Anatoly Semyonovich Levchenko (Russian: Анатолий Семёнович Левченко; May 5, 1941 – August 6, 1988) was a Soviet cosmonaut in the Buran programme.

Trained as a test pilot and selected as a cosmonaut on 12 July 1980, Levchenko was planned to be the back-up commander of the first Buran space shuttle flight. As part of his preparations, he also accomplished test-flights with Buran's counterpart OK-GLI aircraft.

In March 1987, Levchenko began extensive training for a Soyuz spaceflight, intended to give him some experience in space. In December 1987, he occupied the third seat aboard the spacecraft Soyuz TM-4 to the space station Mir, and returned to Earth about a week later on Soyuz TM-3. His mission is sometimes called Mir LII-1, after the Gromov Flight Research Institute shorthand.

In the year following his spaceflight, Anatoly Levchenko died of a brain tumor, in the Nikolay Burdenko Neurosurgical Institute in Moscow.

He was married with one child.

== Awards ==
He was awarded the titles of Hero of the Soviet Union and Pilot-Cosmonaut of the USSR as well as the Order of Lenin.

== Commemoration ==
- Anatoly Levchenko is buried at the Bykovskoye Memorial Cemetery in Zhukovsky.
- There is a memorial plate with his image installed on the wall of house 2 at Chkalova Street where Anatoly once lived in Zhukovsky.

== See also ==
- List of notable brain tumor patients
