= Ptichka =

Reusable launch vehicle

Coordinates: 45°56′25.6″N 63°19′6.3″E

Ptichka Burya
Птичка Буря
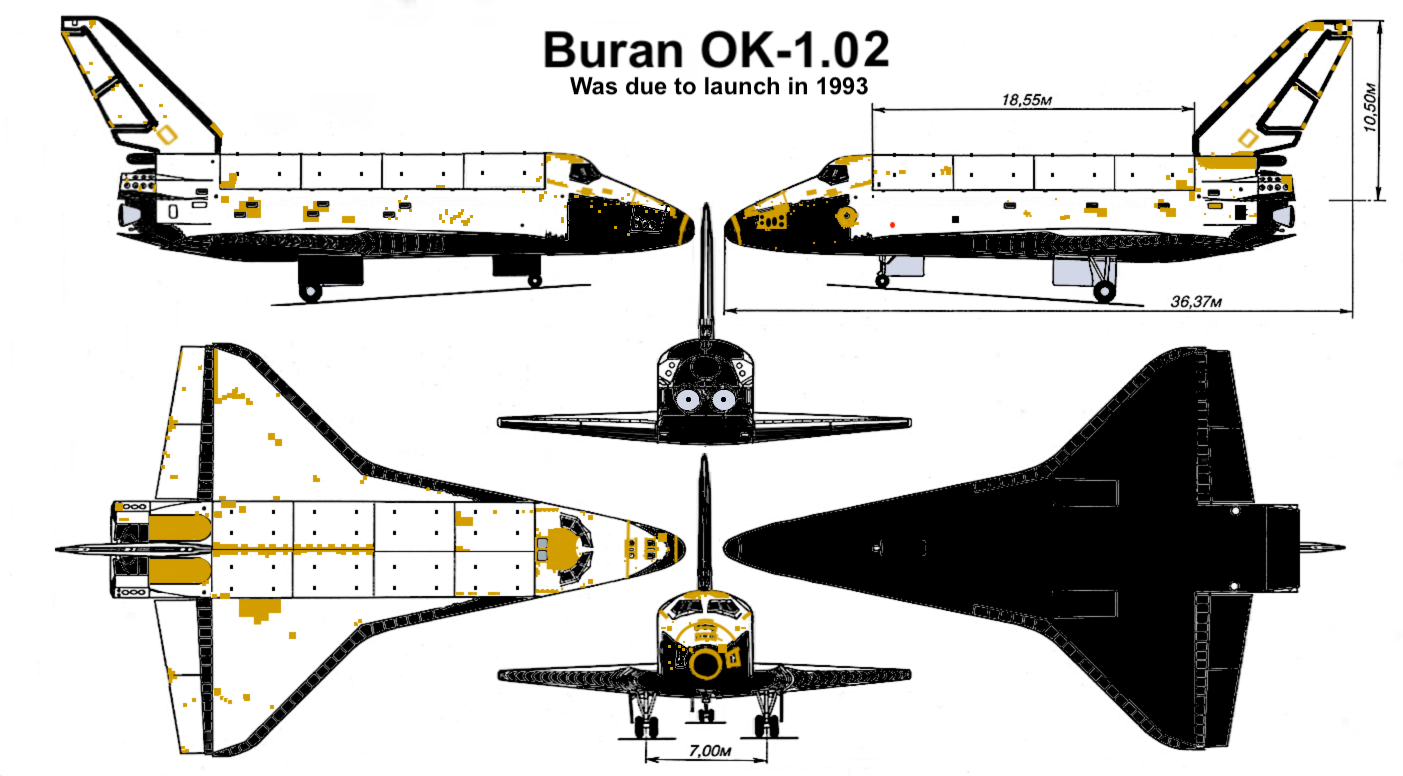
- Type: Buran-class orbiter
- Construction number: 1.02
- Country: Soviet Union
- Status: 95-97% complete

2K (GRAU index serial number 11F35 2K, NPO Molniya airframe number 1.02), often referred to as Ptichka (Russian: Птичка, "little bird", although this was also a nickname for all orbiters in the programme), is the second Buran-class orbiter, produced as part of the Soviet/Russian Buran programme. Although 2K was the closest to being completed of any of the Buran-class orbiters (after the orbiter Buran), it was never finished. The program was officially cancelled in 1993, at which point the shuttle was 95-97% complete. The proposed official name for 2K was Burya (Russian: Буря, "storm" or "tempest").

== Projected flights ==
2K was being prepared for its maiden flight to perform the first fully regular Buran-class orbiter operation. (The flight of Buran was lacking regular thermal control and power systems.) This orbiter was also planned to receive a remote manipulator and docking system.

As of 1989, the orbital flight test program for the second orbiter was split into two missions, with a space station approach test on the second, but delays in preparations changed the plans to perform all test tasks in one maiden flight, scheduled for December 1991. The mission profile included:

- Uncrewed launch;
- Automatic docking with Mir's Kristall module;
- Crew transfer from Mir to the spaceplane, with onboard systems testing in course of twenty-four hours;
- Remote manipulator testing;
- Undocking and autonomous flight in orbit;
- Crewed Soyuz TM No.101 docking to the orbiter;
- Crew transfer from the Soyuz to the spaceplane and on board work in the course of twenty-four hours;
- Automatic undocking, reentry and landing.

== After program cancellation ==
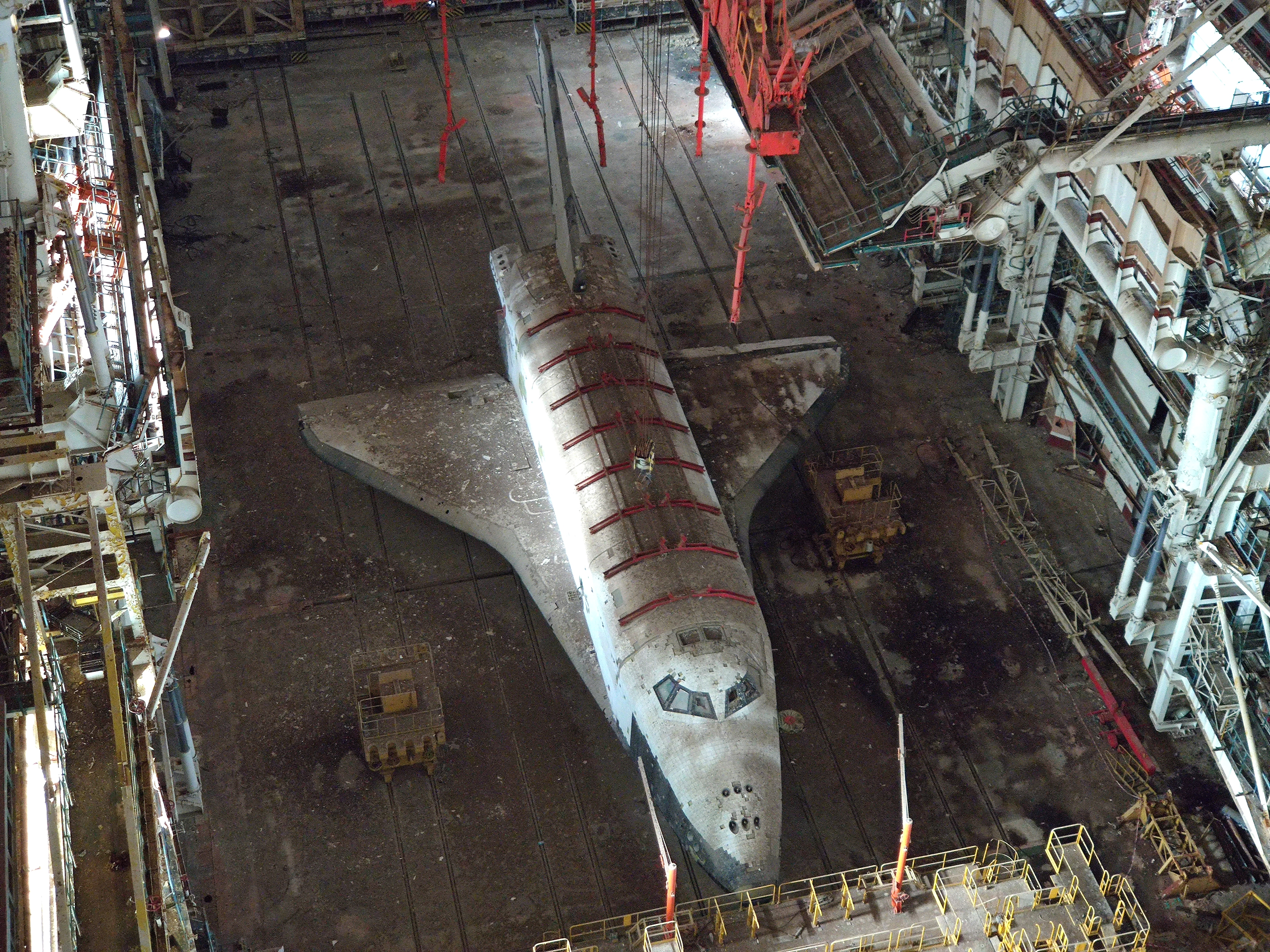
OK-1.02 in storage at Baikonur Cosmodrome in 2020.

In August 1995, 2K was moved into storage within the MZK building (Russian: МЗК, Монтажно-Заправочный Комплекс, "Assembling and Fueling Facility") at Baikonur Cosmodrome, alongside the full size test article OK-MT.

=== Ownership ===
The ownership of 2K and its sister ship Buran has been contested since the fall of the Soviet Union, with the director of Roscosmos Dmitry Rogozin attesting that he had tried to purchase Buran and return it to Russia, but became entangled in legal disputes on its true owner. The contractor for the Buran space programme, RSC Energia, had set up a subsidiary CJSC Energia to manage its overseas assets in 2004, which were then transferred to RSE Infrakos in 2004 and relinquished to JSC KRISP Aelita, a joint Russian-Kazakh company. Kazakh businessman Dauren Musa asserted ownership of 2K in 2011 after purchasing the company's shares, which was disputed by the Kazakh government, but reaffirmed by the country's court after litigation proceedings.

With the Buran destroyed in 2002, 2K is considered valuable as the last of its kind, and Musa has offered to trade the spacecraft in return for the skull of last Kazakh khan Kenesary Kasymov. Kasymov had been beheaded in 1847 and his skull sent to Russia, but his skull remains missing today, with Russia denying knowledge of its location.

=== 2021 graffiti incident ===
In April 2021, 2K was vandalized with graffiti, including the word dobro (Russian: добро, meaning "good") on the right side of the orbiter. Photos of the graffiti surfaced on Instagram and Telegram on May 26, though by that time the orbiter had already been painted over. According to NASASpaceFlight.com, there is evidence that Roscosmos may have known about the vandalism and decided to cover it up.

The vandalism caused distress to many space enthusiasts. Roscosmos also expressed concern and expressed its belief that the Buran hardware at Baikonur Cosmodrome should be transferred to a museum, and that it would discuss the issue at the next Intergovernmental Kazakh-Russian Commission. Dauren Musa, the current owner of the orbiter, also expressed his concern about the state of the hardware, and stated that he would discuss the fate of his orbiters with Roscosmos.

NASASpaceFlight noted that the vandalism may have benefited the orbiters by drawing attention to their condition.

== See also ==
- Mikoyan-Gurevich MiG-105 – Soviet cancelled spaceplane project
