= UMMC Museum Complex =

Museum in Russia

Museum of Military and Automotive Equipment
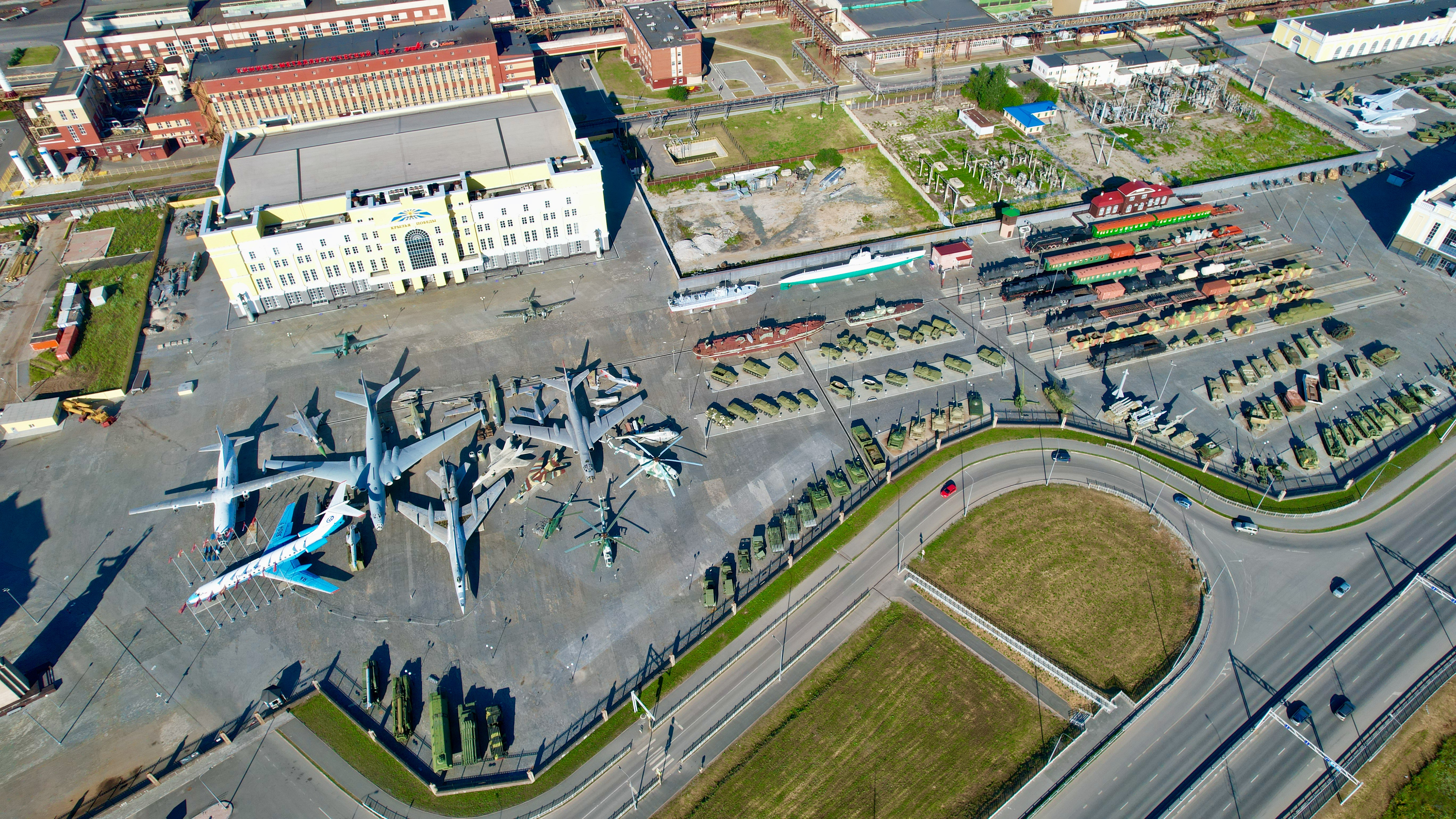
- Exterior of the military museum in 2022.
- Established: 2005; 21 years ago (military museum); 2018; 8 years ago (automotive museum)
- Location: Verkhnyaya Pyshma, Sverdlovsk Oblast, Russia
- Website: mkugmk.ru/ru/

The UMMC Museum Complex (Russian: Музейный комплекс УГМК), fully the UMMC Museum Complex of Military and Civil Equipment (Russian: Музейный комплекс УГМК военной и гражданской техники), is a museum complex located in Verkhnyaya Pyshma, Sverdlovsk Oblast, Russia. The private museum is dedicated to the mechanical and military history of the Ural Federal District. The complex, which constitutes three museums (military, automotive, aviation), is funded by the Ural Mining and Metallurgical Company and houses a substantial collection of vehicles and other artifacts.

== Description ==
=== Background ===
The Russian Urals has a long history of manufacturing as the region's natural resources made it conducive to industrial activity. During World War II, the region underwent a massive change as its industries were geared towards producing war materials. In addition, the relative remoteness of the Ural mountains provided safety from the German invasion of the Soviet Union; as such, factories and their workers were evacuated from Western Russian and relocated to the Urals, leaving a further martial legacy in the region.

=== Military Museum ===
The military museum opened in 2005 in preparation for the 60th anniversary of the Soviet victory in World War II (referred to as the Great Patriotic War in Russia). Funding for the museum came from the Ural Mining and Metallurgical Company (UMMC, in Russian: “Уральская горно-металлургическая компания”, abbreviated in Угмк), a major industrial conglomerate headquartered in Verkhnyaya Pyshma. The museum has since hosted several exhibitions, and in 2011 construction finished on a new visitor center. A 3-story exhibition hall is also located on site.

The predominantly open-air museum displays a range of Soviet and Russian equipment dating from the 1920s into the 1990s. Equipment on display includes tanks, various types of towed and self-propelled artillery pieces, trucks, motorcycles, and other assorted military vehicles. In addition to ground vehicles, the museum has a collection of aircraft. The museum's collection also includes some American equipment (including Sherman and Stuart tanks) sent to the Soviet Union as part of Lend-Lease.

=== Automotive Museum ===
The automotive museum (officially the Museum of Automotive Technology) was considered a temporary exhibition from 2016 until 2018, when it became a permanent part of the museum. According to the museum's website, the automotive museum houses the most extensive collection (numbering around 500 vehicles) of cars and motorized bicycles in Russia. Vehicles on display include vintage cars (including Soviet-era race cars), motorcycles, civilian and military trains, and other assorted vehicles.
