= BOR-5 =

Russian test flight vehicle

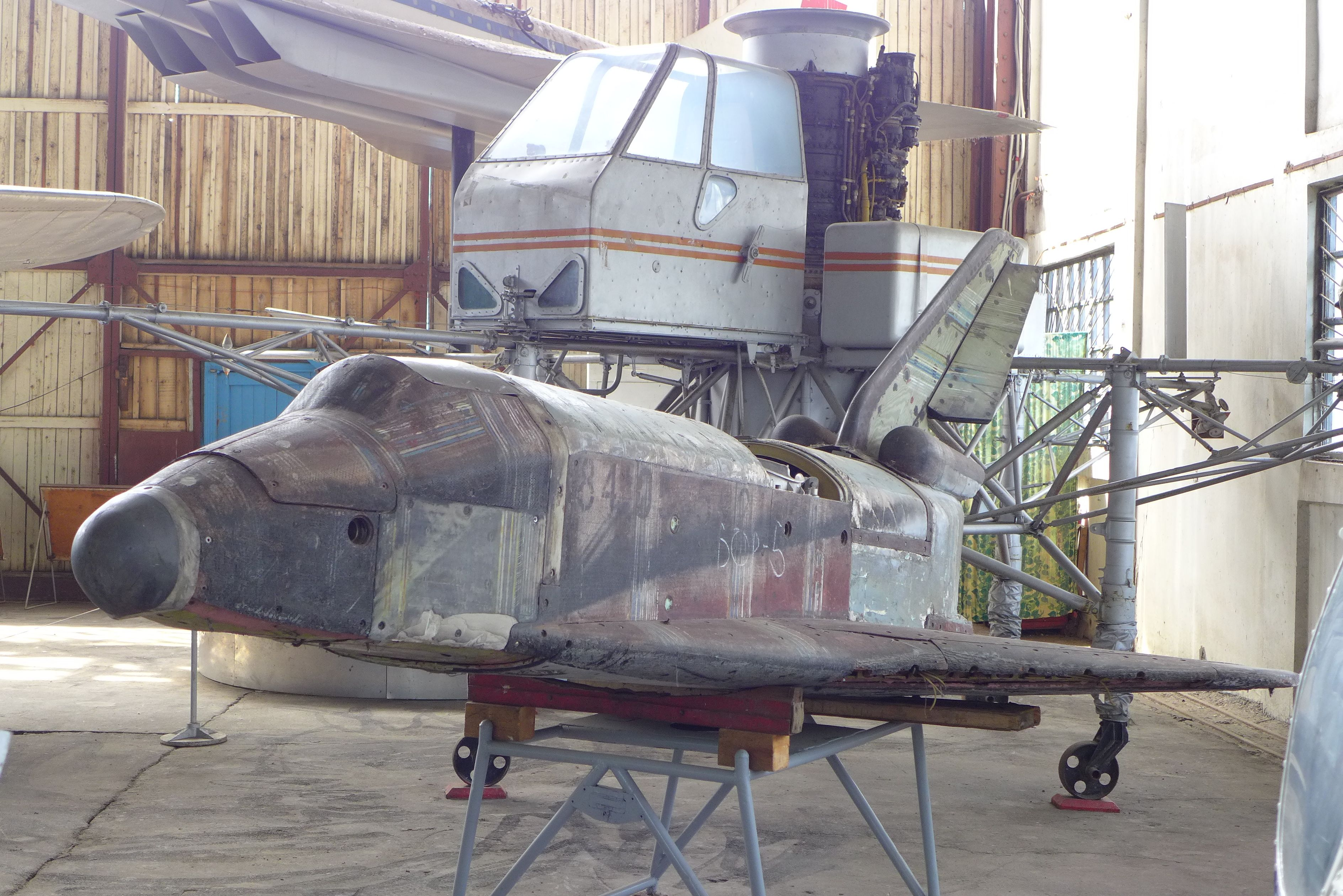
- BOR-5 No. 502 at the Central Air Force Museum in Russia

General information
- Other names: Russian: БОР-5, «Беспилотный Орбитальный Ракетоплан 5; romanized: Bespilotnyi Orbital'nyi Raketoplan 5, Unpiloted Orbital Rocketplane 5
- Type: Unmanned 1:8 scale re-entry test vehicle
- Number built: 5
- Flights: 6

History
- First flight: 5 June 1984
- Last flight: 22 June 1988

The BOR-5 (Russian: БОР-5, «Беспилотный Орбитальный Ракетоплан 5», romanized: Bespilotnyi Orbital'nyi Raketoplan 5, lit. 'Unpiloted Orbital Rocketplane 5') is a 1:8 sized test flight vehicle, used to study the main aerodynamic, thermal, acoustic and stability characteristics of the Buran. It follows upon the BOR-4 reentry test vehicle.

It was put into a suborbital trajectory by a K65M-RB5 rocket launched from Kapustin Yar, near Volga, towards Lake Balkhash at the altitude of about 100 km with velocities from 4000 to 7300 kilometers per second.

== Flights ==
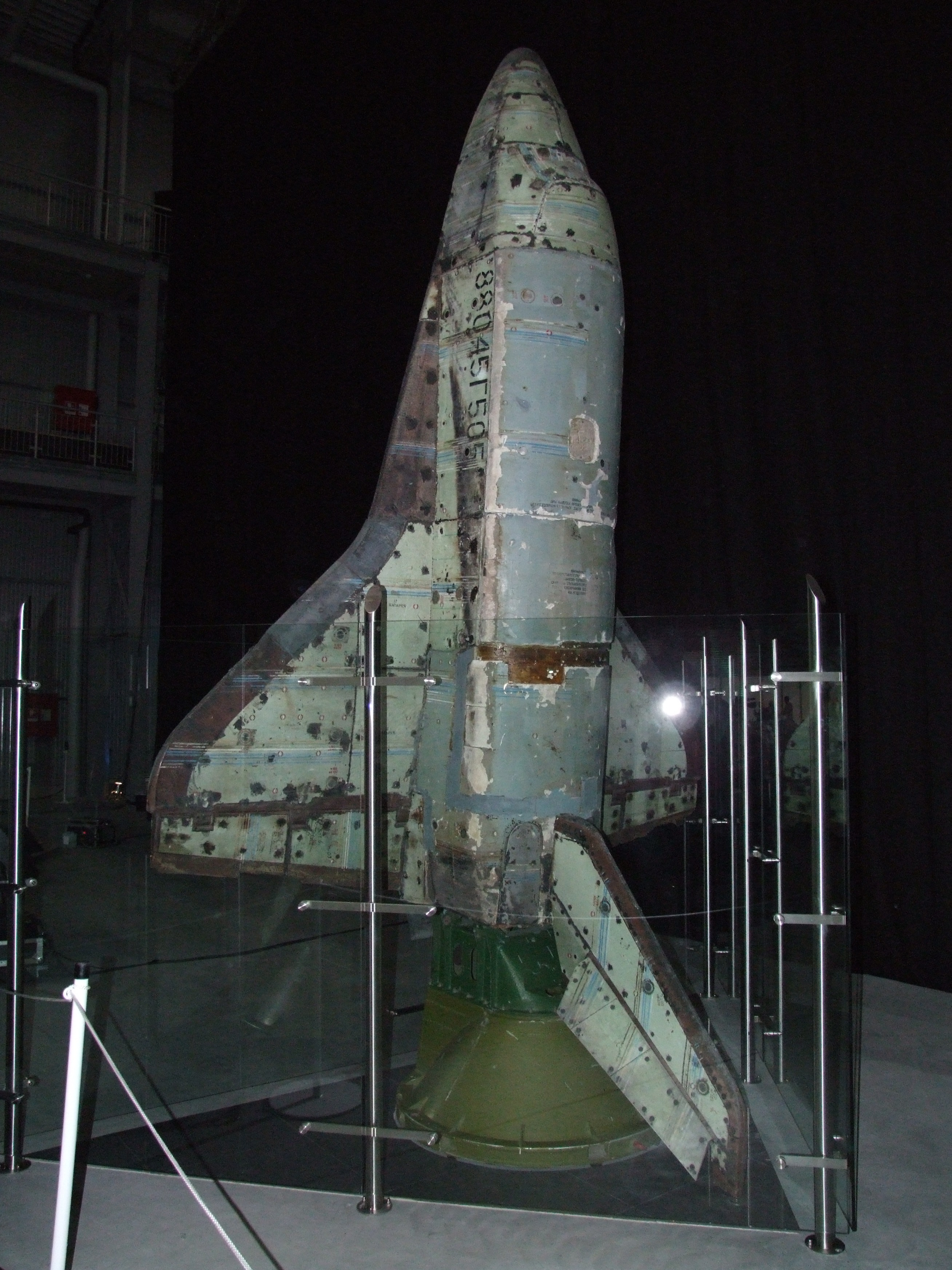
BOR-5 No. 505 at the Technik Museum Speyer in Germany

Six flights were made:

- 4 July 1984 - aborted
- 5 June 1984 - No. 501
- 17 April 1985 - No. 502
- 27 December 1986 - No. 503
- 27 August 1984 - No. 504
- 22 June 1988 - No. 505

== Current locations ==
Two survivors of the BOR-5 tests are known to exist:

- BOR-5 No. 502 - Central Air Force Museum, Monino, Russia
- BOR-5 No. 505 - Technik Museum Speyer, Speyer, Germany
