= Mikoyan-Gurevich MiG-105 =

Soviet cancelled spaceplane project

MiG-105
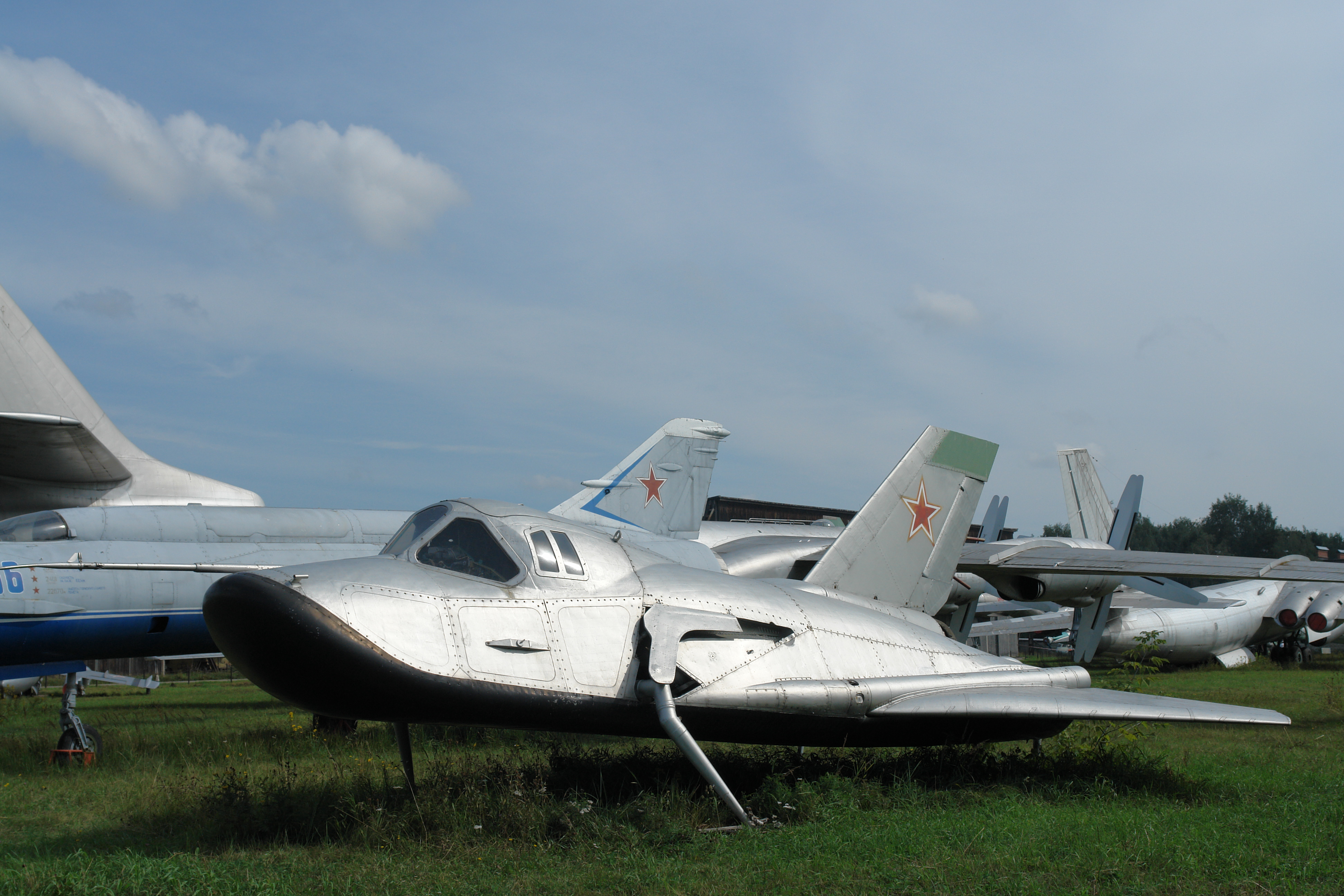
- MiG 105-11 test vehicle at the Central Air Force Museum

General information
- Type: Test vehicle
- National origin: Soviet Union
- Manufacturer: Mikoyan
- Status: Cancelled
- Primary user: Soviet Air Forces

History
- First flight: 1976

The Mikoyan-Gurevich MiG-105, part of the Spiral program, was a crewed test vehicle to explore low-speed handling and landing. It was a visible result of a Soviet project to create an orbital spaceplane. The MiG-105 was nicknamed "Lapot" (Russian: лапоть, or bast shoe; the word is also used as a slang for "shoe"), for the shape of its nose.

== Development ==
The program was also known as the Experimental Passenger Orbital Aircraft (EPOS). Work on this project began in 1965, with the project being halted in 1969, only to be restarted in 1974 in response to the U.S. Space Shuttle Program. The test vehicle made its first subsonic free-flight test in 1976, taking off under its own power from an old airstrip near Moscow. Flight tests, totaling eight in all, continued sporadically until 1978. The actual space plane project was cancelled when the decision was made to instead proceed with the Buran project. The MiG test vehicle itself still exists and is currently on display at the Monino Air Force Museum in Russia.

== Spiral concept ==
- Soviet engineers opted for a midair launch scheme for Spiral. Known as "50 / 50", the idea was that the spaceplane and a liquid fuel booster stage would be launched at high altitude from the back of a custom-built hypersonic jet. The mothership was to have been built by the Tupolev Design Bureau (OKB-156) and utilize many of the same technologies developed for the Tu-144 supersonic transport and the Sukhoi T-4 Mach 3 bomber. It was never built.
- Spiral was a conventional delta wing that featured innovative variable-dihedral wings. During launch and reentry, these were folded upward at 60 degrees. After dropping to subsonic speeds post-reentry, the pilot lowered the wings into the horizontal position, giving the spaceplane better re-entry and flight characteristics.
- Spiral was built to allow for a powered landing and go-around maneuver in case of a missed landing approach. An air intake for a single Kolesov turbojet was mounted beneath the central vertical stabilizer. This was protected during launch and re-entry by a clamshell door which opened at subsonic speeds.
- Spiral was to have been protected by what Soviet engineers termed "scale-plate armour": niobium alloy VN5AP and molybdenum disilicide plated steel plates mounted on articulated ceramic bearings to allow for thermal expansion during reentry. Several BOR (Russian acronym for Unpiloted Orbital Rocketplane) craft were flown to test this concept.
- In the event of a booster explosion or in-flight emergency, the crew compartment of Spiral was designed to separate from the rest of the vehicle and parachute to earth like a conventional ballistic capsule; this could be done at any point in the flight.
- Spiral was intended to carry only its pilot.
- Spiral was designed to land on skids, which deployed from a set of doors on the sides of the fuselage just above and ahead of the wings.

== BOR reentry test vehicles ==
Another spacecraft to use the Spiral design was the БОР (Russian: Беспилотный Орбитальный Ракетоплан, Bespilotnyi Orbital'nyi Raketoplan, "Unpiloted Orbital Rocketplane") series, uncrewed sub-scale reentry test vehicles. American analogs were the X-23 PRIME and ASSET. Several of these craft have been preserved in aerospace museums around the world.

Image	Type	Launch date	Usage	Current status
	BOR-1	15.07.1969	Flight test, the experimental 1:3 scale model. Burned in the atmosphere at a height of about 60–70 km at a speed 8 000 mph (12 900 km/h). Was deployed at an altitude 328,083 ft (100 km) by 11K65	Burned (planned).
	BOR-2	1969–1972	Sub-scale model of the Spiral space plane. Four launches.	NPO Molniya, Moscow
	BOR-3	1973–1974	Sub-scale model of the Spiral space plane. Two launches.: 1. Destruction of the nose fairings after launch at a height of about five km (speed 0.94 Mach).; 2. Flight program is fully implemented. Crashed on landing (Parachute failure)	Crashed.
	BOR-4	1980–1984	Sub-scale model of the Spiral space plane. Four launches and two unconfirmed	NPO Molniya, Moscow
	BOR-5	1984–1988	Flight tests, the experimental sub-scale base model. Five launches. Different from Spiral spaceplane shape, data was also used in the Buran project.	Technik Museum Speyer, Germany; Museum in Monino, Russia
	BOR-6		Sub-scale model of the Spiral space plane	NPO Molniya, Moscow

== Specifications (MiG 105-11) ==
Data from Soviet X-planes

General characteristics

- Crew: 1
- Length: 10.6 m (34 ft 9 in) (including instrument boom)
- Wingspan: 6.7 m (22 ft 0 in)
- Wing area: 24 m^{2} (260 sq ft)
- Empty weight: 3,500 kg (7,716 lb)
- Gross weight: 4,220 kg (9,304 lb)
- Fuel capacity: 500 kg (1,100 lb)
- Powerplant: 1 × RD-36-35K turbojet, 19.61 kN (4,410 lbf) thrust

Performance

- Maximum speed: 800 km/h (500 mph, 430 kn)
- Maximum speed: Mach 0.65
- Wing loading: 175 kg/m^{2} (36 lb/sq ft)
- Landing speed: 250–270 km/h (160–170 mph; 130–150 kn)

== See also ==
- Buran Shuttle
- Dream Chaser
- Space Shuttle

Aircraft of comparable role, configuration, and era

- X-20 Dyna-Soar
- X-24
- NASA X-38 Crew Return Vehicle
