= Baikonur (disambiguation) =

Baikonur is a city in Kazakhstan rented by the Russian Federation for the Russian space program.

It can also be:

== Places ==
- Baikonyr, a river in Kazakhstan.
- Baikonur (Ulytau Region), a mining town in Kazakhstan that lent its name to the space city.
- Baikonur Cosmodrome, a Russian-operated spaceport in the Kazakhstan city.
- Baikonur Krayniy Airport, one of the airports for Baikonur.
- Baikonur (Almaty Metro), a metro station in Almaty, Kazakhstan.
- 2700 Baikonur, a minor planet.

=== Mars ===
- Baykonyr, a crater in Mars.

== Sports ==
- FC Baikonur, a football club from Kyzylorda, Kazakhstan.
