= Rimantas Stankevičius =

Soviet-Lithuanian pilot (1944-1990)

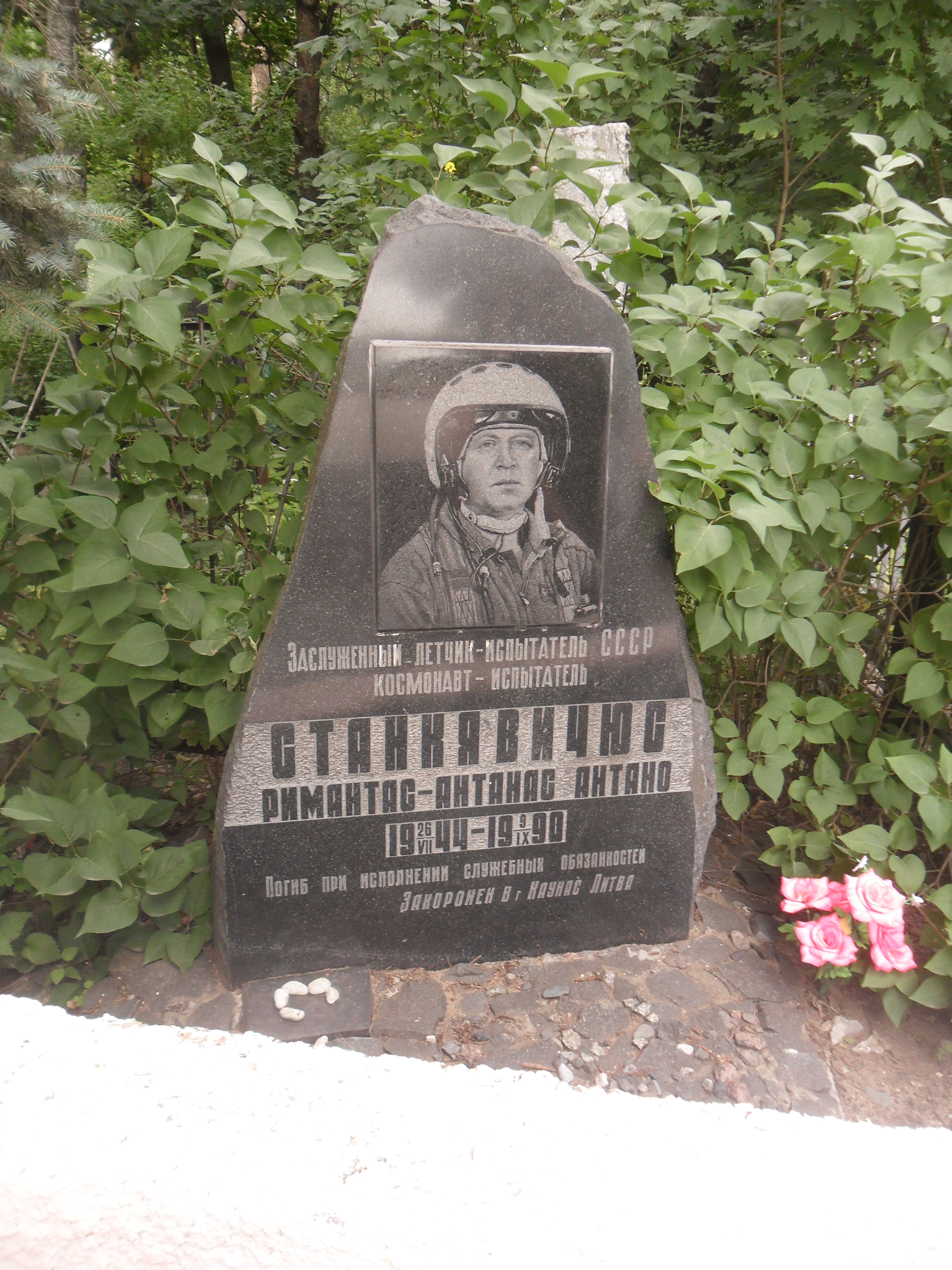
Cenotaph in honor of Rimantas Stankevicius

Rimantas Antanas Stankevičius (Lithuanian: Rimantas Antanas Stankevičius, Russian: Римантас Анта́нас Станкявичюс; 26 July 1944 in Marijampolė, Lithuania – 9 September 1990 in Salgareda, Italy) was a Lithuanian test pilot and cosmonaut in the Soviet space shuttle Buran programme. He was killed in a crash of his Su-27 fighter plane during an airshow in Salgareda.

== Biography ==
In 1966 he graduated from Chernigov Higher Aviation School. After that he served as a USSR pilot in Germany, Egypt, and Turkmenistan. In 1975 Stankevičius graduated from the Fedotov Test Pilot School and became a test pilot. He accomplished spin testing of MiG-29. He flew 57 types of aircraft and had over 4000 hours of flying experience. In 1982 he was graded as a 1st class test-pilot.

In 1979 he was assigned to the Buran programme. In February 1982 he passed all the required exams and became the first Lithuanian cosmonaut. After September 1984 he trained to fly the 11F35 (Buran, USSR space shuttle). Stankevičius accomplished 14 test-flights with Buran's counterpart BTS-02 aircraft and 6 taxi tests with Buran. He was both the pilot and the commander of the space shuttle.

Stankevičius, along with Soviet cosmonauts Igor Volk and Sergei Tresvyatskiy, worked closely with Americans in the late 1980s to improve relations during the Cold War. The three were involved in what is believed to be the first formation flight with Soviet SU-27 fighter planes and American F-16s in history in July 1990 (before the breakup of the USSR) at the Opening Ceremonies of the Goodwill Games in Seattle. The three also flew the first Americans, (8 members of the Organizing Committee of the 1990 Goodwill Games) since World War II in an Ilyushin Il-62 from Seattle to Petropavlovsk-Kamchatsky, USSR in 1989. Petropavlovsk-Kamchatsky was one of the most important and secretive air and submarine bases in the USSR.

In 1990 Rimantas Stankevičius participated in the Everett Air Show with a Su-27 fighter jet. Soon after his return home, he went to Italy to replace another USSR pilot in Salgareda Air Show.

== Death ==
Stankevičius was killed in the crash of a Sukhoi Su-27 fighter, '14 Red', at the Salgareda Air Show at Treviso, Italy on 9 September 1990. During the flight, he started a loop in a lower altitude than he estimated and made an unintentional touchdown. He died in the crash. The crash resulted in only one fatality aside from the pilot.

Stankevičius is buried in Kaunas, Lithuania.
