= Yubileyniy Airport =

Airport in Kazakhstan

- IATA: none; ICAO: UAON

Summary
- Coordinates: 46°03′N 63°14′E
- Interactive map of Yubileyniy Airport

Runways
Direction	Length		Surface
Direction	ft	m	Surface
06/24		4,500x84	... etc.

Helipads
Number	Length		Surface
Number	ft	m	Surface
			... etc.

Statistics
- ... etc.

Yubileyniy (ICAO: UAON, FAA LID: XXX) is an airport in Kyzylorda Oblast, Kazakhstan. It is part of the Baikonur cosmodrome. It sits 40 km north-north-west of Baikonur (at the site of 251 cosmodrome Baikonur) in the desert region of Ushkyzyl.

The airport is leased by Russia from Kazakhstan as part of the Baikonur complex. The aerodrome operator is FSUE (Federal State Unitary Enterprise) FSUE "TsENKI" (Tsentr Ekspluatatsii ob yektov Nazemnoy Kosmicheskoy Infrastruktury or Center for Operation of Ground-Based Space Infrastructure).

Yubileyniy airfield supports all types of aircraft, including An-225 "Mriya". The maximum take-off weight is 392 metric tons.

== History ==
The airfield was built in the early 1980s for the development of the Buran reusable spacecraft program. The decree establishing the landing complex was adopted in October 1977. The airfield received the name "Jubilee," in connection with the 60th anniversary of the October Revolution. NPO Molniya was appointed the lead developer of the complex. The 20th Central Design Institute of the USSR Ministry of Defense carried out the design.

In 1979, crews from the 130th Engineering Department began construction on the 4500 x 84 m runway. The runway used M-600 monolithic high-strength concrete with a thickness of 26–32 cm on a sand-cement foundation with a thickness of 18 to 22 cm. The total excavation volume was about 2 million m^{3}. The first facilities were commissioned in November 1981.

The first landing was made in February 1980 by an Mi-8 helicopter from the aviation regiment of the Baikonur Cosmodrome". On January 29, 1982, an An-26 landed.

The first transportation to Baikonur of elements of the reusable space system “Energia - Buran” by plane (VM-T) took place on April 8, 1982. From 1982 to 1990, 59 VM-T flights were made to deliver large elements of the space complexes "Energy" and Buran. Buran spacecraft were transported to the Ramenskoye airfield near Moscow and the units of the Energia launch vehicle - from Izymyanka airfield in Kuibyshev (now Samara).

The airfield belonged to the Ministry of Defense. After 1992, the airfield was abandoned and partially looted.

In 1995, the need arose to support heavy aircraft from the United States, launching US spacecraft under international commercial programs. Yubileyny became Khrunichev Space Center, the manufacturer of Proton heavy launch vehicles. Recruitment for civil aerodrome personnel was initiated. Radio navigation, radio communications, lighting, meteorological and other equipment were updated, and the runway was overhauled. In 1997, these works were completed and the experimental airfield was put into operation.

From 1997 to 2011, the aerodrome received passenger flights carrying administrative and technical personnel. In 2017, the airfield was transferred to the FSUE "TsENKI". A reconstruction of the airfield was planned for 2018.

== Geography ==
The terrain is a slightly wavy plain (altitude 95–120 m). 4 km northeast of the airfield is Ushkızıl mountain (altitude 135 m).

Flora include wormwood-boylychy (northern) desert. The soils are brown desert-steppe. 8 km north of the airfield are sand Darbas.

No permanent watercourses and reservoirs are nearby. In the spring, after snowmelt and rain, takyr, small temporary lakes up to 0.5 m deep form.

== See also ==
- Baikonur
- Baikonur Krayniy Airport
