= BXY =

BXY may refer to:

- BXY, the IATA code for Baikonur Krayniy Airport, Kazakhstan
- BXY, the National Rail station code for Bexley railway station, London, England
