= Baikonur Krayniy Airport =

Airport in Kazakhstan

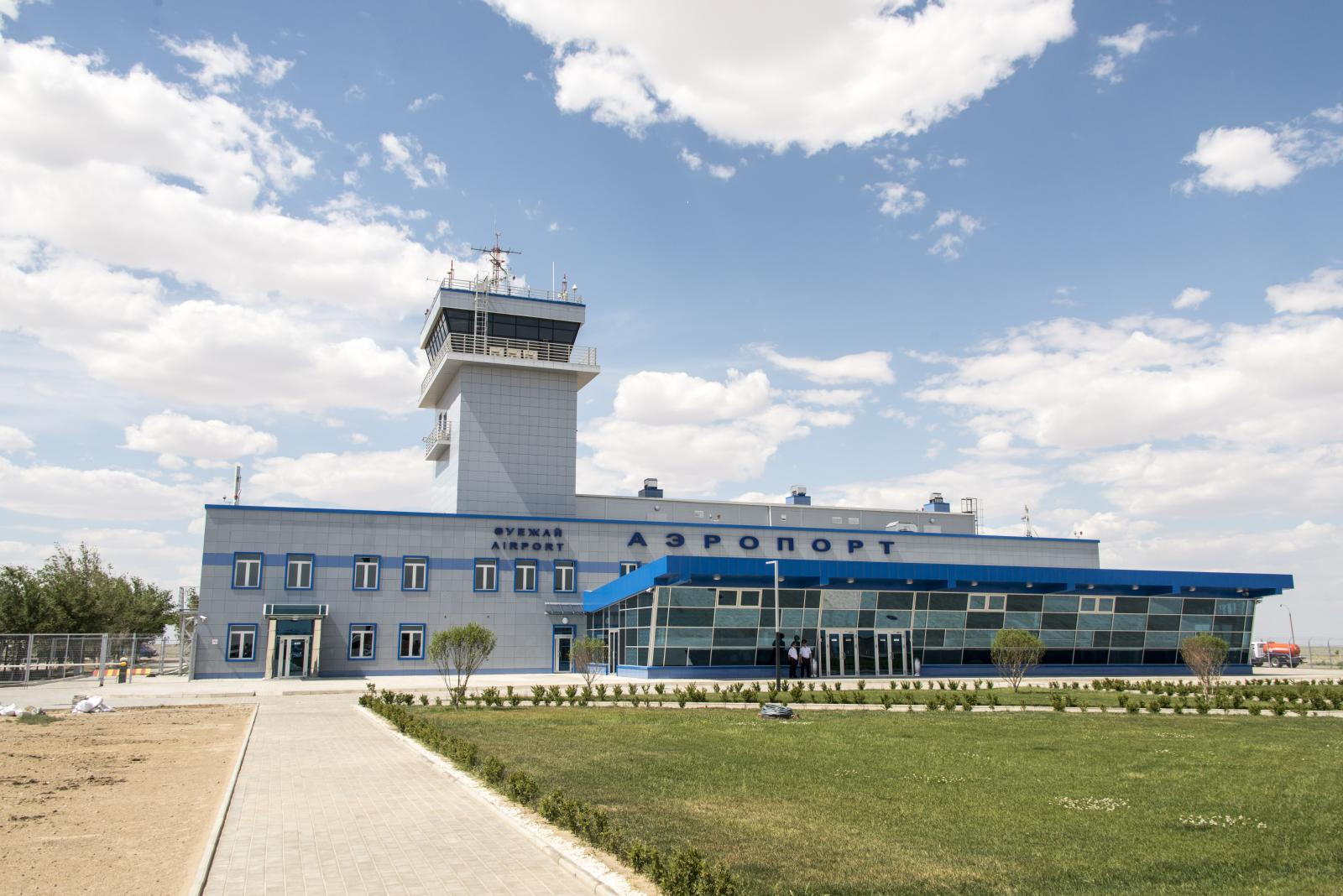
- IATA: BXY; ICAO: UAOL

Summary
- Airport type: Public
- Location: Baikonur, Kazakhstan
- Time zone: UTC+05:00 (+05:00)
- Elevation AMSL: 100 m / 328 ft
- Coordinates: 45°37′25″N 063°12′50″E

Map
- Location in Kazakhstan

Runways
Direction	Length		Surface
Direction	m	ft	Surface
05/23	3,100	10,171	Asphalt
- IATA search page

Baikonur Krayniy Airport (Russian: Аэропорт Крайний — Байконур) (IATA: BXY, ICAO: UAOL) is the airport serving the city of Baikonur in Kazakhstan. It is located on the right bank of the Syr Darya river, 6 km west of Baikonur (at site 15A of the Baikonur cosmodrome).

The official name is "Baikonur (Extreme)". The airport operates charter passenger and cargo-passenger flights to Moscow, and occasionally to other cities of Russia and Kazakhstan.

The airport is part of the Baikonur complex, leased by Russia from Kazakhstan for a period until 2050, and is included in the State Register of Civil Airfields of the Russian Federation.

== Specifications ==
Aerodrome Extreme class B has one runway and is able to receive aircraft such as the IL-76 (with restrictions by aircraft weight and number of takeoffs and landings per day), Tu-154, Airbus A310, A320 and anything lighter, including helicopters of all types.

Classification number PCN Runway 53 / F / C / W / T was known as 21 / R / B / X / T until 2015. The width of taxiway No. 3 is 18 m. Taxiways No. 1, 2, 4, and 5 are temporarily (pending their reconstruction) not used.

To the north of the airfield, the Arys-I - Kandyagash (Kandagach) railway runs from west to east near Tyuratam Station, at 7 km north-east of the airfield and traverse number 103 at 5 km north of the airfield. In Western historical and geographical sources, Extreme is designated as Tyuratam or Tyuratam1 (after the name of the nearest railway station Tyuratam).

In the northern part of the Baikonur Сosmodrome, 40 km north-northwest of the city of Baikonur there is an experimental airfield, Yubileyniy.

Five km east of the airfield, on the western outskirts of the city of Baikonur, there is a helipad where a special-purpose aviation detachment is based for the Ministry of Internal Affairs of the Russian Federation (helicopters "Robinson R44 "). The helipad was created in July 2004. airport_region: KZ 45°37′48.88″N 63°17′55.03″E

There is also a helipad on the territory of Hospital No. 1 FGUZ MSCH-1 FMBA RF in the city of Baikonur (formerly a military hospital). airport_region: KZ 45°36′52.40″N 63°18′45.53″E
