= OK-GLI =

Soviet space programme test vehicle

OK-GLI BTS-02
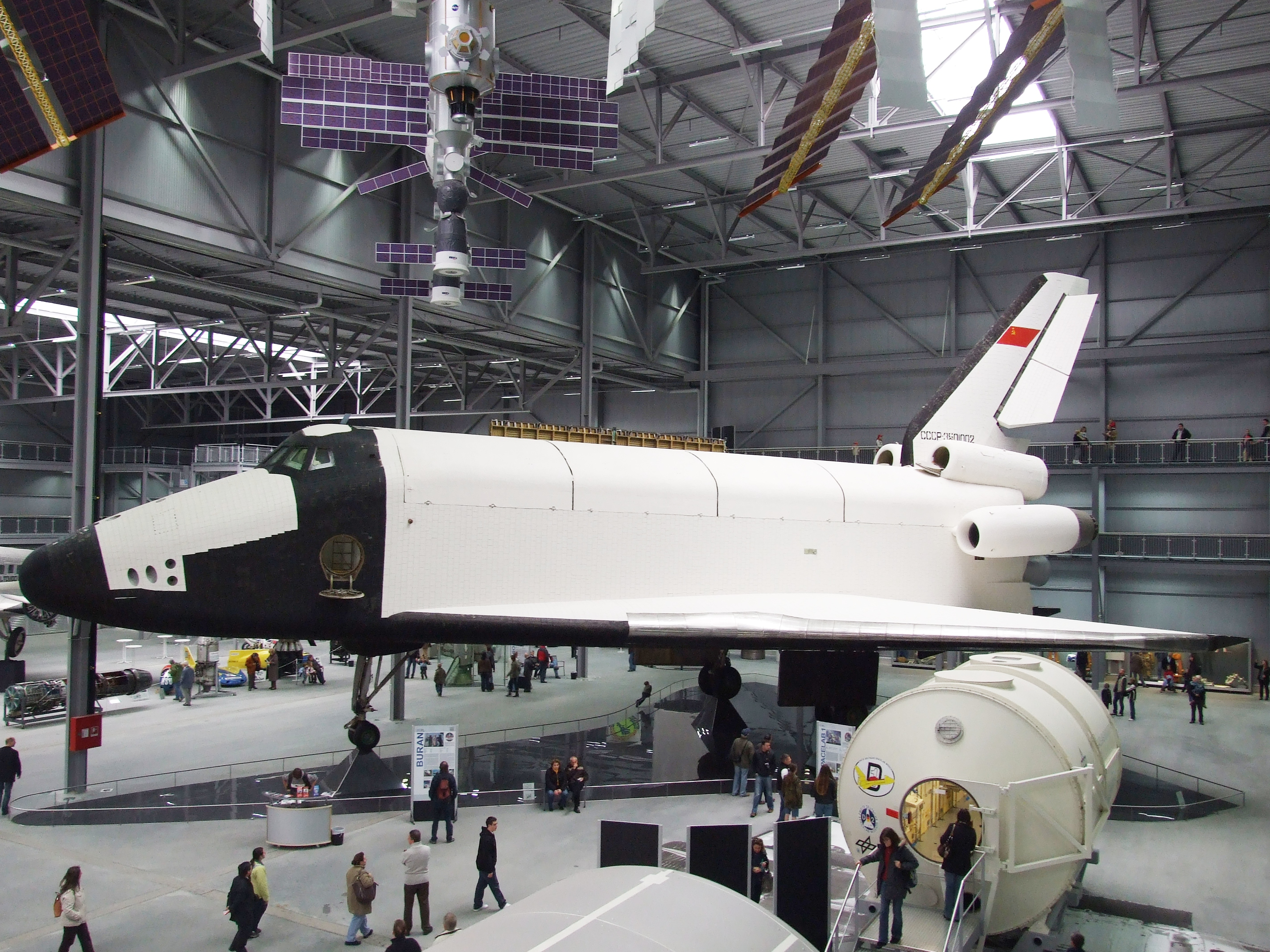
- Atmospheric Buran testbed currently on display in Technik Museum Speyer
- Construction number: OK-0.02
- Country: Soviet Union
- Status: At the Technik Museum Speyer, Germany
- First flight: Flight 1; 10 November 1985
- Last flight: Flight 25; 15 April 1988
- No. of missions: 25 test flights

The OK-GLI (Russian: Орбитальный корабль для горизонтальных лётных испытаний, ОК-ГЛИ, romanized: Orbital'nyy korabl' dlya gorizontal'nykh lotnykh ispytaniy, lit. 'Orbital ship for horizontal flight tests'), also known as Buran Analog BTS-02 (Russian: БТС-02, Большой транспортный самолёт второй, romanized: bolshoi transportny samolyot vtoroi, lit. 'big transport aircraft, the second'), was a Soviet atmospheric test vehicle ("Buran aerodynamic analogue") of the orbital Buran spacecraft. It was constructed for the Buran programme in 1984, and was used for 25 test flights between 1985 and 1988 before being retired.

The aircraft was subsequently put on exhibit in Australia (2000), Bahrain (2002) and since 2008 has been on exhibit at the Technik Museum Speyer in Germany.

== Construction ==
The development of the Buran vehicles by the Soviet Union began in the late 1970s as a response to the Space Shuttle program of the United States. The construction of the orbiters began in 1980, and by 1984 the first full-scale Buran was rolled out. The first suborbital test flight of a scale-model took place as early as July 1983. As the project progressed, five additional scale-model flights were performed.

The OK-GLI (Buran Analog BST-02) test vehicle ("Buran aerodynamic analogue") was constructed in 1984. It was fitted with four AL-31 jet engines mounted at the rear (the fuel tank for the engines occupied a quarter of the cargo bay). This Buran could take off under its own power for flight tests, in contrast to the American Enterprise test vehicle, which was entirely unpowered and relied on an air launch.

The jet engines were used to take off from a normal landing strip, and once it reached a designated point, the engines were shut down and the OK-GLI glided back to land. This provided valuable test data about the handling characteristics of the Buran design. The powered-engine approach significantly differed from the carrier plane/air drop method used by the US and the Enterprise test craft.

== Test flights ==
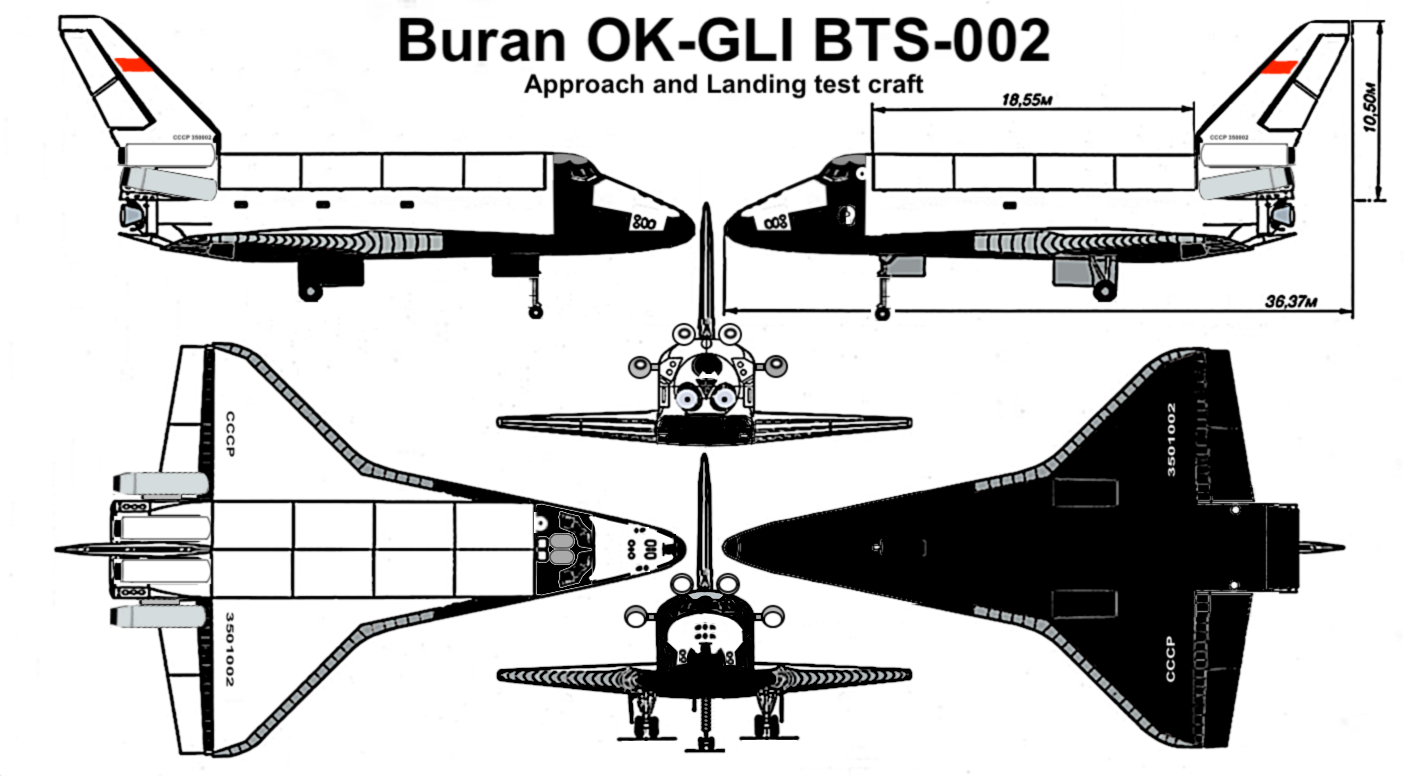
Buran flight test Orbiter OK-GLI

Until the end of the Soviet Union in 1991, seven cosmonauts were allocated to the Buran programme. All had experience as test pilots and flew on the OK-GLI test vehicle. They were: Ivan Bachurin, Alexei Borodai, Anatoli Levchenko, Aleksandr Shchukin, Rimantas Stankevičius, Igor Volk and Viktor Zabolotsky.

In total, nine taxi tests and twenty-five test flights of the OK-GLI were performed, after which the vehicle was "worn out". All tests and flights were carried out at the Zhukovsky Air Base, outside Moscow.

Date	Description	Maximum speed	Maximum altitude	Time	Crew/notes
29 December 1984	Taxi test 1	45 km/h		5 minutes	Rimantas Stankevičius, Igor Volk
2 August 1985	Taxi test 2	200 km/h		14 minutes	Rimantas Stankevičius, Igor Volk
5 October 1985	Taxi test 3	270 km/h		12 minutes	Rimantas Stankevičius, Igor Volk
15 October 1985	Taxi test 4	300 km/h			Rimantas Stankevičius, Igor Volk
10 November 1985	Flight 1	480 km/h	1500 m	12 minutes	Rimantas Stankevičius, Igor Volk
15 November 1985	Taxi test 5	170 km/h		12 minutes	Rimantas Stankevičius, Igor Volk
3 January 1986	Flight 2	520 km/h	3000 m	36 minutes	Rimantas Stankevičius, Igor Volk
26 April 1986	Taxi test 6			14 minutes	Anatoli Levchenko, Alexandr Shchukin
27 May 1986	Flight 3	540 km/h	4000 m	23 minutes	Rimantas Stankevičius, Igor Volk
11 June 1986	Flight 4	530 km/h	4000 m	22 minutes	Rimantas Stankevičius, Igor Volk
20 June 1986	Flight 5	600 km/h	4500 m	25 minutes	Anatoli Levchenko, Alexandr Shchukin
28 June 1986	Flight 6	650 km/h	5000 m	23 minutes	Anatoli Levchenko, Alexandr Shchukin
10 December 1986	Flight 7	700 km/h	4000 m	24 minutes	First automatic landing Rimantas Stankevičius, Igor Volk
23 December 1986	Flight 8	750 km/h	6000 m	17 minutes	Rimantas Stankevičius, Igor Volk
29 December 1986	Flight 9			17 minutes	Anatoli Levchenko, Alexandr Shchukin
16 February 1987	Flight 10			28 minutes	Rimantas Stankevičius, Igor Volk
25 February 1987	Flight 11			19 minutes	Rimantas Stankevičius, Igor Volk
29 March 1987	Taxi test 7			2 minutes	Anatoli Levchenko, Alexandr Shchukin
30 March 1987	Taxi test 8			25 minutes	Anatoli Levchenko, Alexandr Shchukin
21 May 1987	Flight 12			20 minutes	Anatoli Levchenko, Alexandr Shchukin
25 June 1987	Flight 13			19 minutes	Rimantas Stankevičius, Igor Volk
5 October 1987	Flight 14			21 minutes	Automatic landing Shchukin, Igor Volk
15 October 1987	Flight 15			19 minutes	Ivan Bachurin, Alexei Borodai
16 January 1988	Flight 16				Rimantas Stankevičius, Igor Volk
24 January 1988	Flight 17				Ivan Bachurin, Alexei Borodai
23 February 1988	Flight 18			22 minutes	Rimantas Stankevičius, Igor Volk
4 March 1988	Flight 19			32 minutes	Rimantas Stankevičius, Igor Volk
12 March 1988	Flight 20				Ivan Bachurin, Alexei Borodai
23 March 1988	Flight 21				Ivan Bachurin, Alexei Borodai
28 March 1988	Flight 22				Ivan Bachurin, Alexei Borodai
2 April 1988	Flight 23			20 minutes	Rimantas Stankevičius, Igor Volk
8 April 1988	Flight 24				Rimantas Stankevičius, Igor Volk
15 April 1988	Flight 25			19 minutes	Rimantas Stankevičius, Igor Volk
29 December 1989	Taxi test 9				Rimantas Stankevičius, Viktor Zabolotsky

== Post-retirement ==
=== Zhukovsky Air Base ===
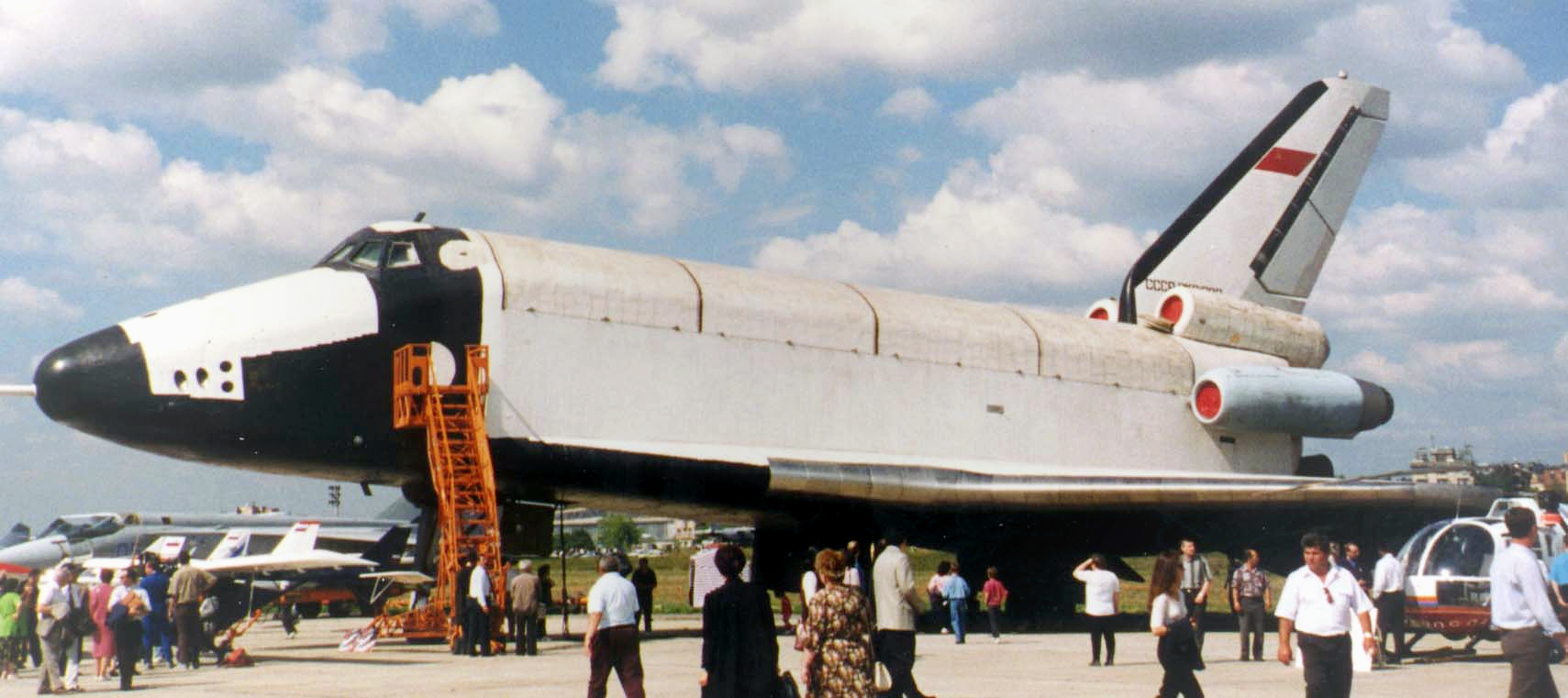
OK-GLI at MAKS-1997

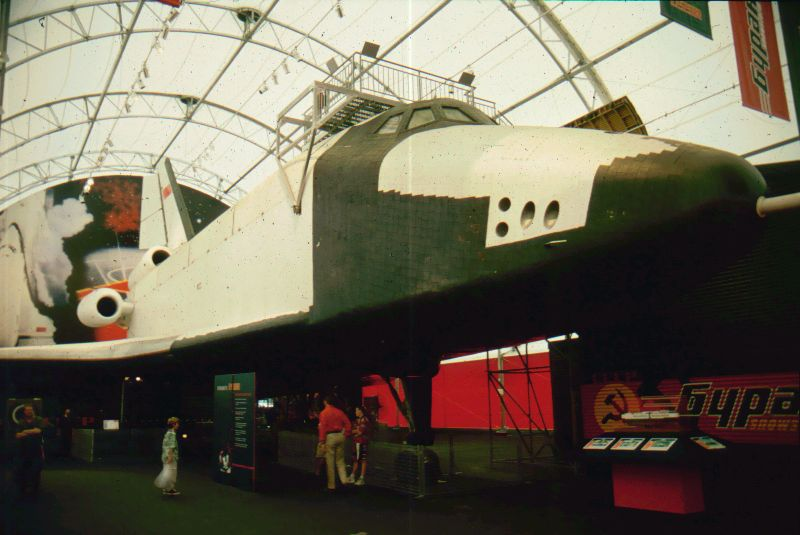
OK-GLI in Sydney

After the program was cancelled, the OK-GLI was stored at Gromov Flight Research Institute, near Moscow, where it was displayed during the annual MAKS air show.

=== Sydney, Australia ===
In 2000, the OK-GLI was sold to an Australian company called the Buran Space Corporation, owned by Australian astronaut Paul Scully-Power. It was disassembled and transported by ship to Sydney, Australia, via Gothenburg, Sweden; arriving on 9 February 2000 and appeared as a static tourist attraction under a large temporary structure in Darling Harbour for a few years.

Upon reassembly, the OK-GLI was put on display in a temporary enclosure for the 2000 Summer Olympics in Sydney. Visitors could walk around and inside the vehicle (a walkway was built along the cargo bay), and plans were in place for a tour of various cities in Australia and Asia. The owners went into bankruptcy after the Olympics, and the vehicle was moved into the open air and stored for a year in a fenced-in parking lot and protected by nothing more than a large tarpaulin, where it suffered deterioration and repeated vandalism.

The OK-GLI was then offered for sale, including by a radio auction on the American News 980 KFWB-AM with a starting price of US$6 million, however it did not receive any genuine bids.

=== Bahrain ===
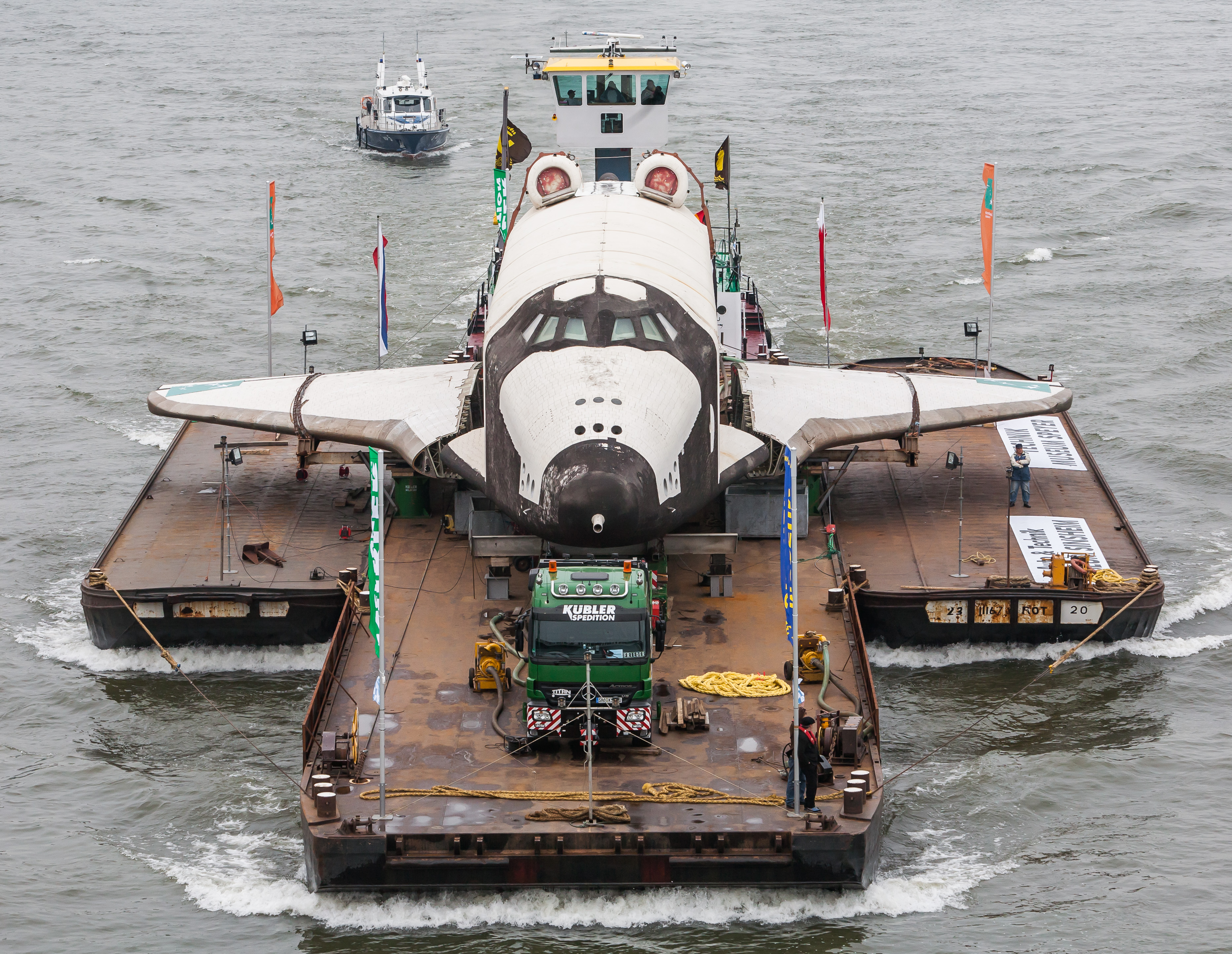
OK-GLI on the Rhine

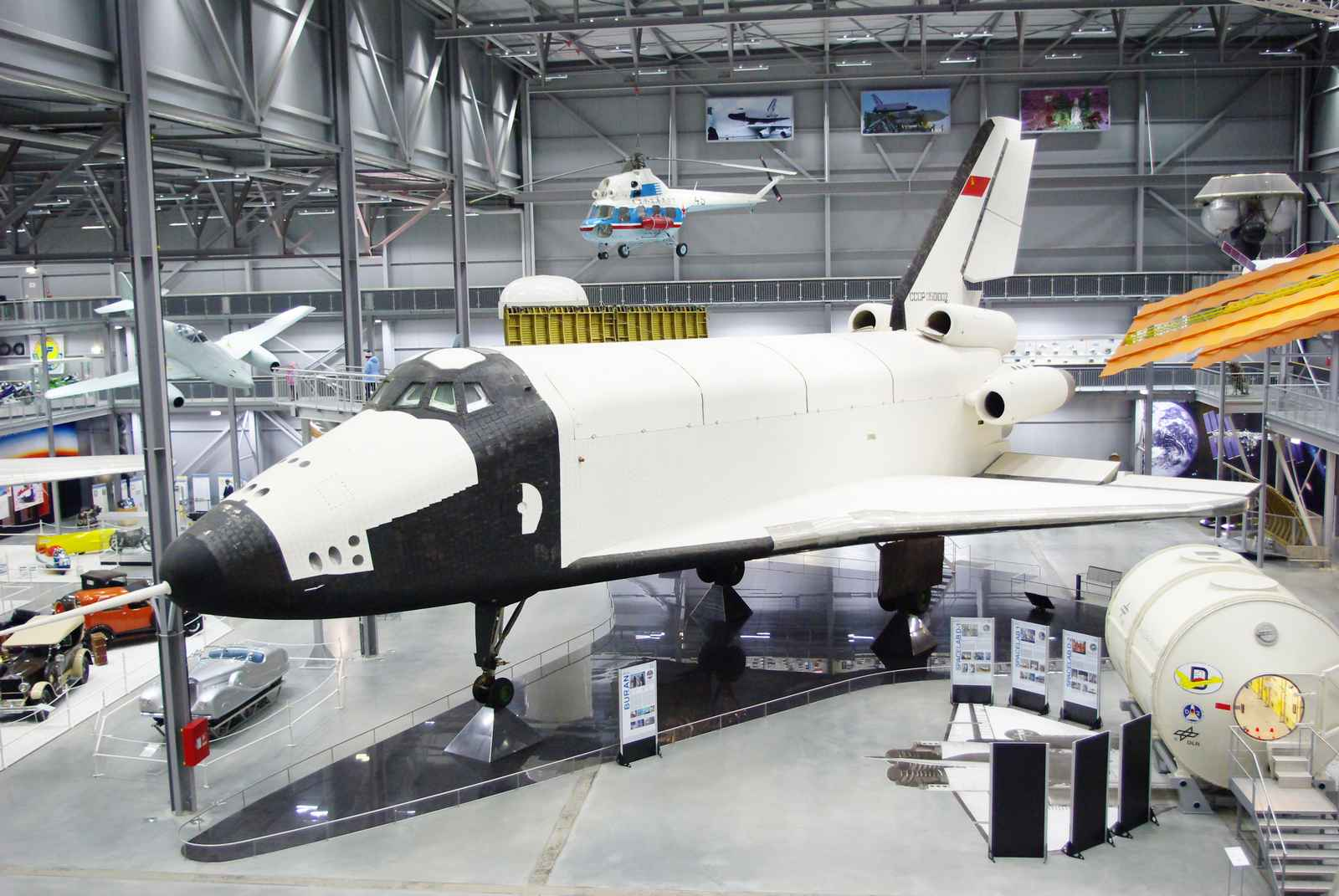
OK-GLI at Technik Museum Speyer

In September 2004 a team of German journalists found the OK-GLI in Bahrain, having been abandoned after it was on display as an attraction of the 2002 "Bahrain Summer" festival.

It was then bought by the Sinsheim Auto & Technik Museum, to be transported to Germany in 2005. Due to legal issues, it remained in Bahrain for several years, pending settlement of an international court case over fees.

=== Technik Museum Speyer, Germany ===
On 4 March 2008 the OK-GLI began its journey by sea to the Technik Museum Speyer where it was refurbished and serves as a walk-in exhibit.

The journey got off to an inauspicious start when, during the transfer from the storage barge to the ship, there was a failure of the aft spreader (part of the lifting mechanism) and the tail of the vehicle dropped from just above deck height to the bottom of the hold. No one was hurt and both the ship and vehicle seemed to suffer only minor damage.

== See also ==
- Buran (spacecraft) – Buran spacecraft 1.01
- MAKS (spacecraft) - Soviet air-launched spaceplane concept
- Mikoyan-Gurevich MiG-105 – Soviet spaceplane test program
- Space Shuttle Enterprise - American Space Shuttle atmospheric test article
- Space Shuttle program - American spaceplane program
- Tupolev OOS - Soviet air-launched spaceplane concept
