= Töretam =

Station on the Moscow to Tashkent railway in Kazakhstan

Coordinates: 45°39′00″N 63°18′50″E

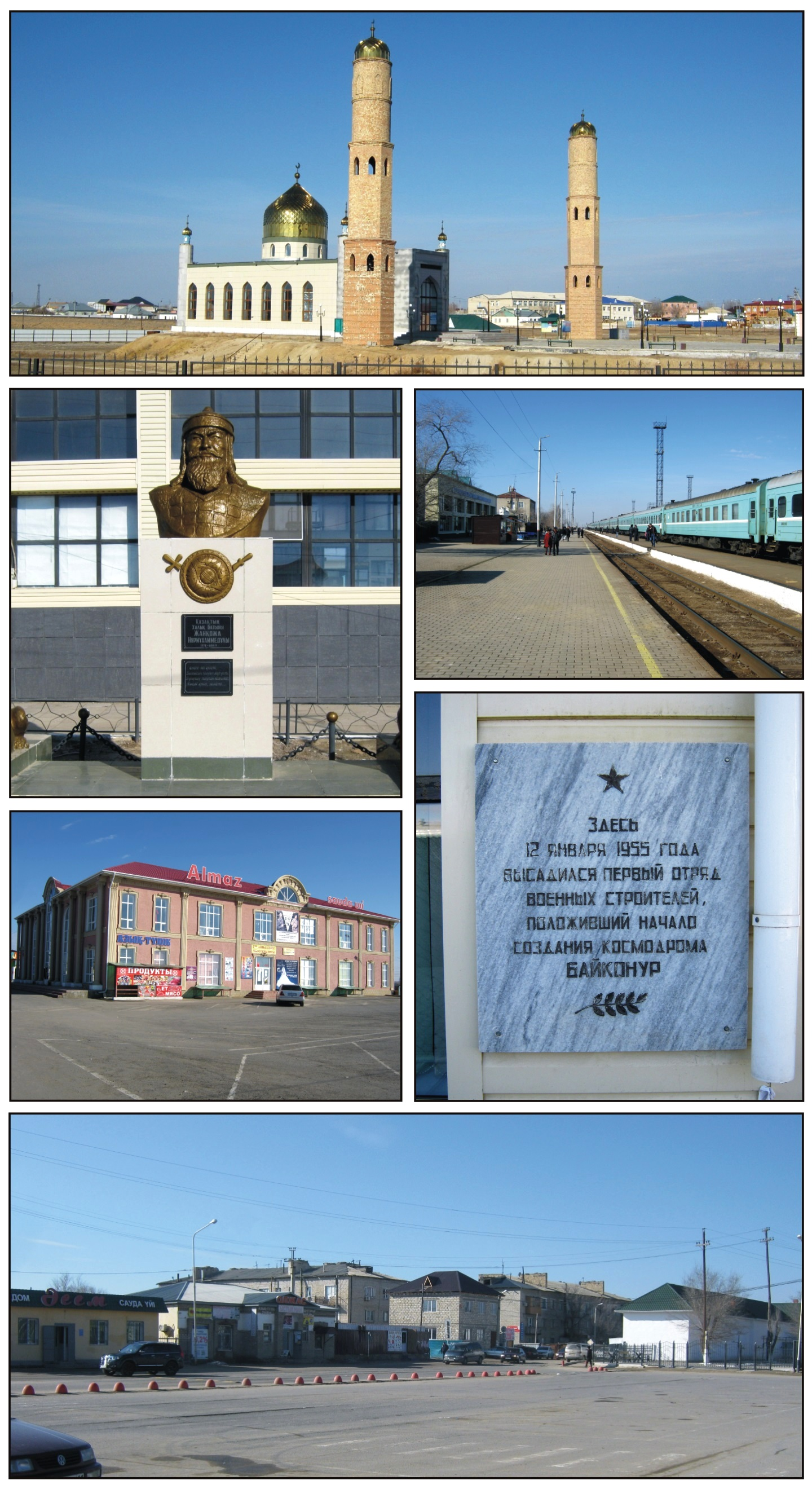

Töretam (Kazakh: Төретам, romanized: Töretam; Russian: Тюратам, romanized: Tyuratam) is a station on the Trans-Aral Railway, located in Kazakhstan. The name means "Töre's grave" in the Kazakh language. Töre, or more formally, Töre-Baba, was a nobleman and descendant of Genghis Khan. Töretam is near the Baikonur Cosmodrome, a Russian – formerly Soviet – spaceport, and near the city of Baikonur (formerly Leninsk, Baiqongyr in Kazakh), which was constructed to service the cosmodrome.

== History ==
In the mid-1950s, the Soviet Union announced that space activities were being conducted from the Baikonur Cosmodrome, which was assumed to be near the mining village of Baikonur, in the Kazakh SSR. The naming was a bit of misdirection as the launch facilities were located 250–300 kilometres (160–190 mi) to the southwest at Töretam. At a press conference for the Apollo–Soyuz Test Project, Jules Bergman of ABC News said to astronaut Thomas P. Stafford,

Baikonur, if you'll look on the coordinates, is 135 miles [217 km] away or something. Tyuratam may only be a railhead, but it is the Tyuratam Launch Complex. They call it Baikonur, I know. . . . I'm going to call it Tyuratam. ABC is going to call it Tyuratam. SAC calls it Tyuratam. Can we once and for all straighten that out and arrive at a . . . name for it, Tom?

Deke Slayton said if they wanted to use the name the Soviets commonly used, they would have to say Baikonur. Although it is likely the Soviets originally called it Baikonur to hide its location, the Baikonur Cosmodrome quickly surpassed the original village of Baikonur's fame and importance. In 1995, the city that was founded to the south of Töretam to support the cosmodrome, originally named Leninsk by the Soviets, was officially renamed to Baikonur (Baiqongyr in Kazakh), after the cosmodrome.

The CIA tried to locate this launch site by systematically tracking over the major rail networks of the Soviet Union in Central Asia with U-2 spy planes. The site was discovered and photographed in 1957. Francis Gary Powers was scheduled to fly over it on his ill-fated mission in 1960.
