= Baikonur (Ulytau Region) =

Baikonur Байқоңыр (Kazakh) Байконур (Russian)
- Location in Kazakhstan Baikonur (Asia)
- Coordinates: 47°49′23″N 66°2′50″E
- Country: Kazakhstan
- Region: Ulytau Region

Population (2009)
  - Total: 427
- Time zone: UTC+6 (UTC+6)

Baikonur (Russian: Байконур) or Baiqoñyr (Kazakh: Байқоңыр) is a small mining town in central Kazakhstan near Jezkazgan. Coal mining began in 1914.

In 1961, the name was appropriated for the Baikonur Cosmodrome about 320 kilometres southwest of the older mining town; some sources state this was done in order to keep the actual location of the cosmodrome secret. Leninsk, the town built to support the cosmodrome, was renamed Baikonur in 1995 after the fall of the Soviet Union.

== Geography ==
The River Baiqoñyr flows by the village.
