= Baikonur =

City in Kazakhstan with a Russian spaceport

Baikonur Байқоңыр (Kazakh) Байконур (Russian)
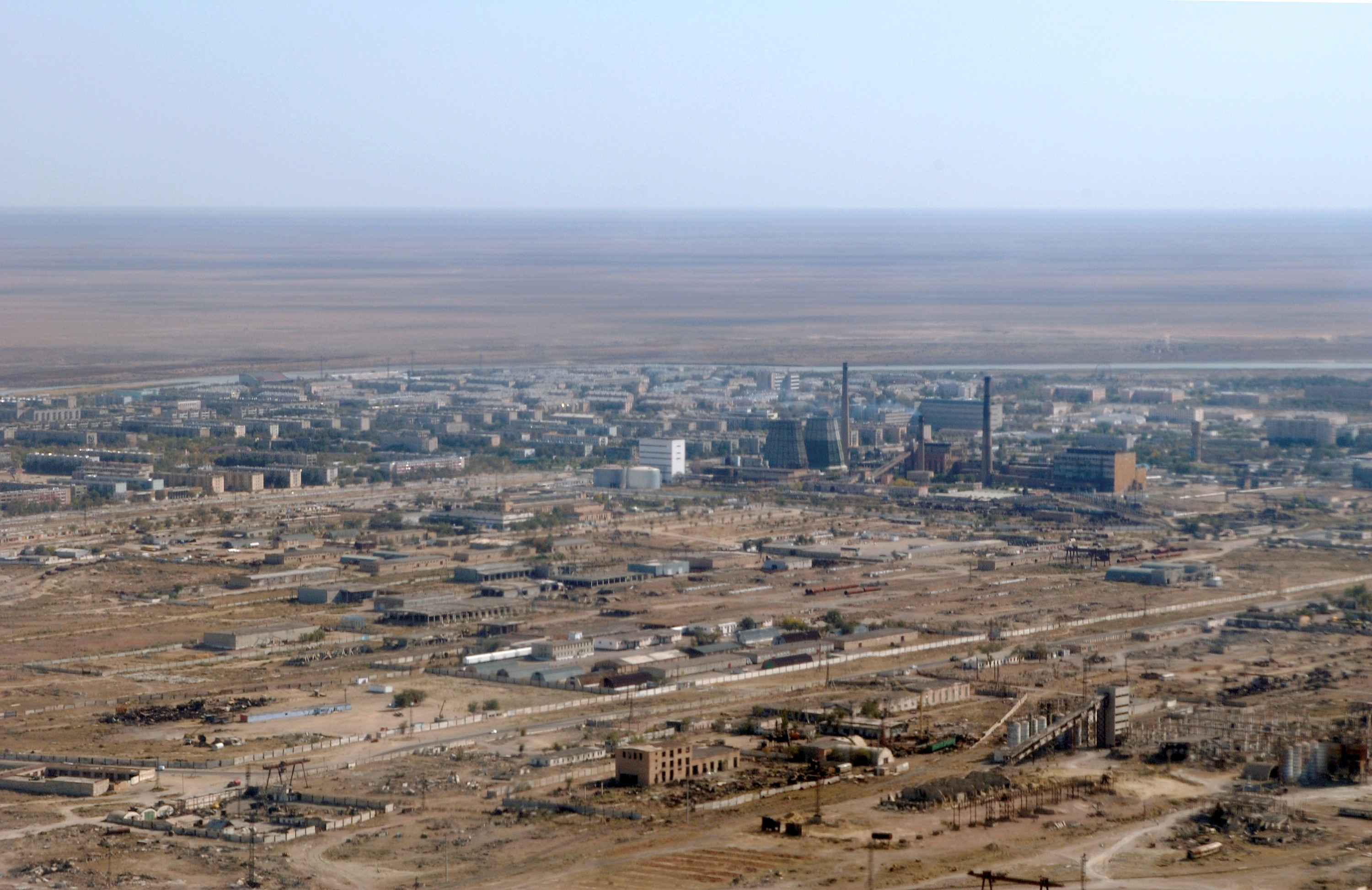
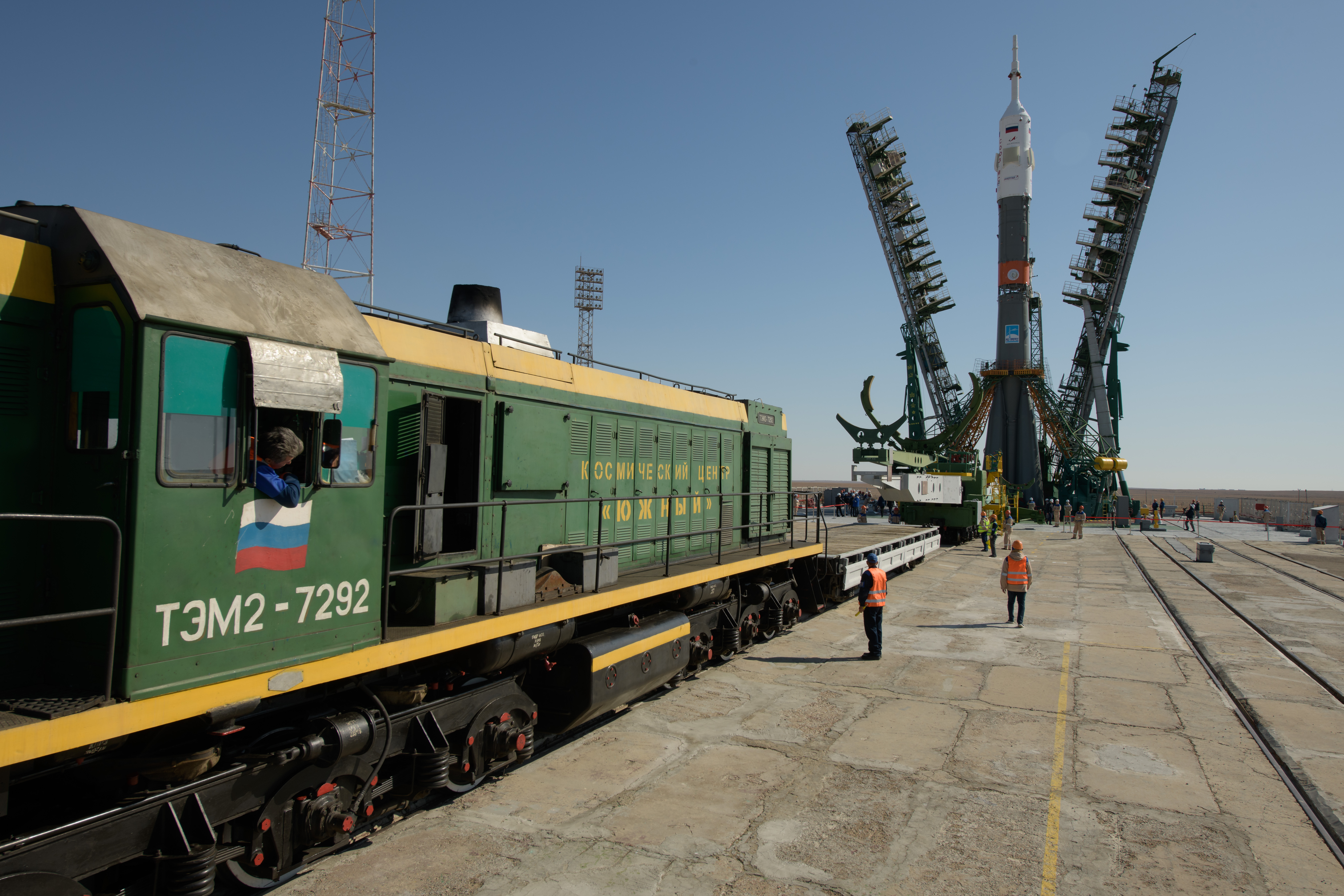
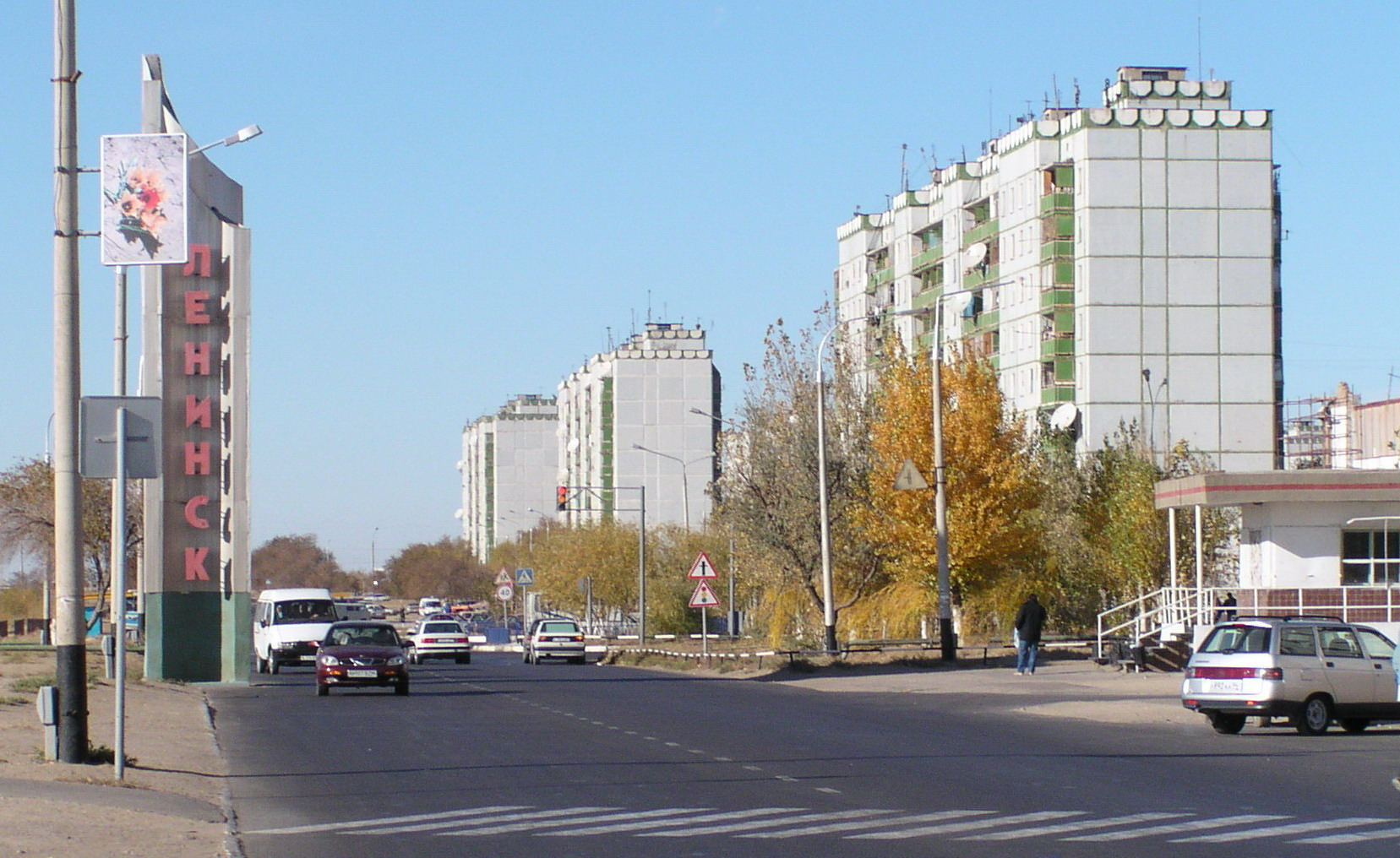
- Clockwise from top: view over Baikonur, Gagarin Avenue, Gagarin's Start

- Flag Seal

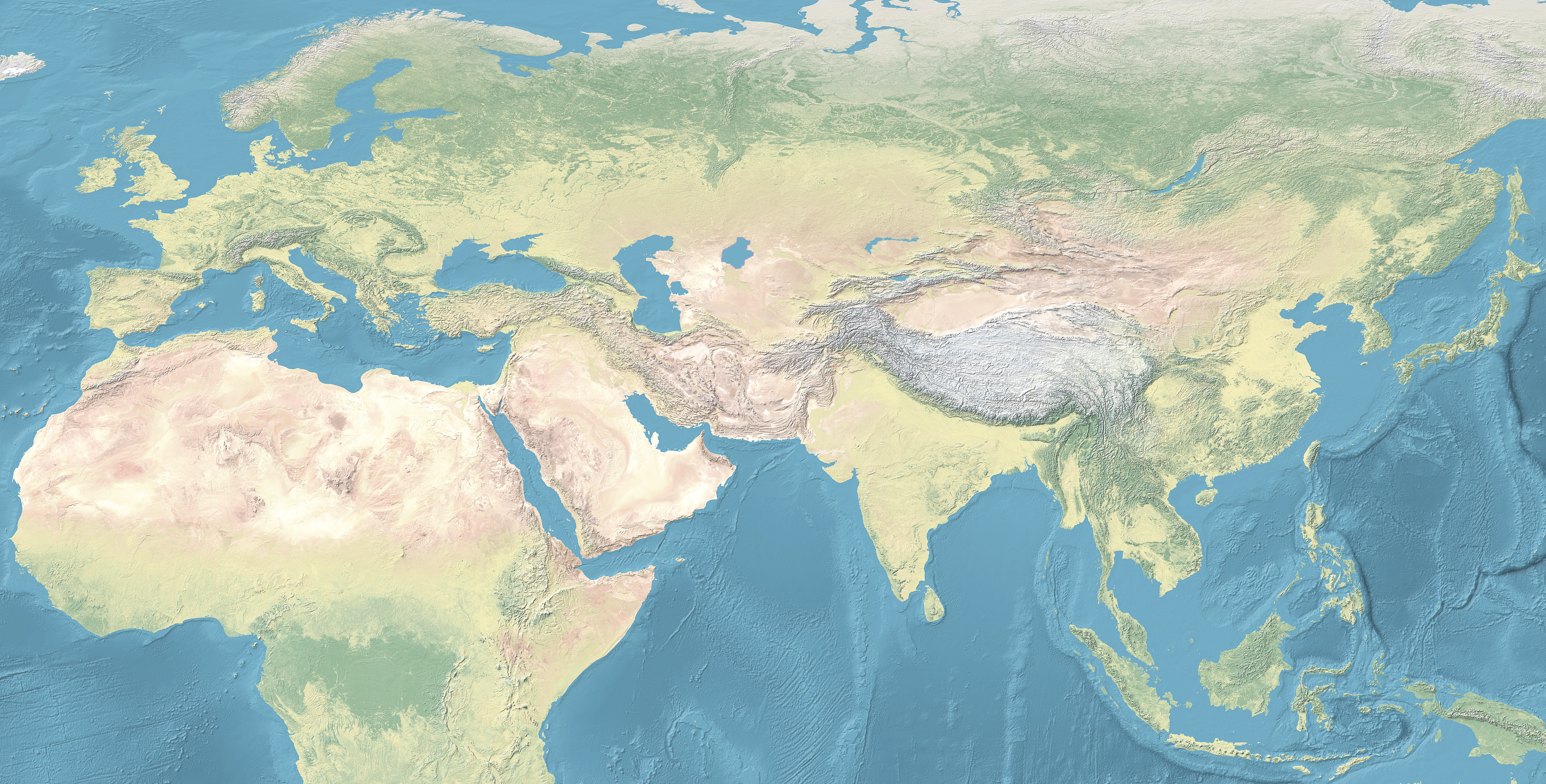
- Location in Kazakhstan Baikonur (Asia) Baikonur (Eurasia)
- Coordinates: 45°37′0″N 63°19′0″E
- Country: Kazakhstan; Russia (administered)
- Founded: 1955
- Incorporated (city): 1966

Government
  - Administrator: Konstantin Dmitrievich Busygin

Area
  - Total: 57 km^{2} (22 sq mi)
- Elevation: 100 m (330 ft)

Population (2020)
  - Total: 39,341
  - Density: 690/km^{2} (1,800/sq mi)
- Time zone: UTC+05:00
- Postal code: 710501
- Area code: +7 73622
- Vehicle registration: N, 11 (Kazakhstan), 94 (Russia)
- Climate: BWk
- Website: www.baikonuradm.ru

Baikonur (Note: English: /ˌbaɪkəˈnʊər, -ˈnɜːr/ BY-kə-NOOR, -NUR; Russian: Байконур, romanized: Bajkonur, pronounced [bəjkɐˈnur]; Kazakh: Байқоңыр, romanized: Baiqoñyr, pronounced [b̥ɑjqʰoŋʊ́r]) is a city in Kazakhstan on the northern bank of the Syr Darya river. It is currently leased and administered by the Russian Federation until 2050. It was constructed to serve the Baikonur Cosmodrome with administrative offices and employee housing. During the Soviet period, the town was known as Leninsk, and was sometimes referred to as Zvezdograd (Russian: Звездоград, lit. 'Star City'). It was officially renamed Baikonur by Russian president Boris Yeltsin on December 20, 1995.

The Russian controlled area is an ellipse measuring 90 kilometres (56 mi) east to west by 85 km (53 mi) north to south, with the cosmodrome situated at the area's centre.

Foreign visitors and tourists can visit the cosmodrome and city but need to obtain a specific permit from Roscosmos.

== History ==
Historical affiliations

Soviet Union 1955–1991
∟ Kazakh SSR
Kazakhstan 1991–present
∟ (Russia) Russian Federation (lease) 1991–2050

The original Baikonur (Kazakh for "wealthy brown", i.e. "fertile land with many herbs") is a mining town located about 320 kilometres (200 mi) northeast of the present-day spaceport, near Dzhezkazgan in Kazakhstan's Karagandy Region. In the run-up to the Vostok 1 flight in April 1961, Soviet authorities deliberately applied the name "Baikonur" to the launch site to obscure its true location. Residents of the mining town briefly exploited the confusion to obtain scarce materials before officials discovered the misunderstanding.

The modern city of Baikonur was built several kilometres south of the existing railway settlement of Töretam, which predates the cosmodrome. Töretam, located on the Trans-Aral Railway, served as the original railhead in the region and gave the early test range its first widely used name, "Tyuratam".

The fortunes of the new city have risen and fallen with the Soviet and later Russian space programme and the operations of the Baikonur Cosmodrome. Due to its military and scientific significance, the settlement was a closed city during the Soviet period and did not appear on publicly available maps before perestroika.

The Soviet government formally established the Scientific-Research Test Range No. 5 (Russian: Nauchno-Issledovatel'skii Ispytatel'nyi Poligon No. 5; NIIIP-5), or by decree on 12 February 1955. The U-2 reconnaissance aircraft first identified and photographed the Tyuratam missile test range (the present-day Baikonur Cosmodrome) on 5 August 1957.

Most local landmarks reflect the city's close ties to the space programme, with only a few exceptions such as the preserved locomotive, an Orthodox church, and a mosque.

Administratively, the city belongs to the Odintsovsky District of Moscow Oblast in accordance with internal Russian arrangements, but it remains an administrative unit of Kazakhstan. Under the bilateral agreement between Russia and Kazakhstan, Baikonur is granted an unofficial status equivalent to a Russian city of federal significance for the duration of the lease of the Baikonur complex (currently through 2050).

== Places of interest ==
South of city center, near the Syr Darya River there is a large park with several sports and amusement facilities. Among these is a ferris wheel, which is no longer in use. The park is located at coordinates 45°36′42″N 63°19′06″E.

== Climate ==
Baikonur features a cold desert climate (BWk). Summers are hot with July highs averaging slightly over 34 °C (93 °F), while winters are cold, with longer periods of sustained below-freezing temperatures.

Climate data for Baikonur
Month	Jan	Feb	Mar	Apr	May	Jun	Jul	Aug	Sep	Oct	Nov	Dec	Year
Mean daily maximum °C (°F)	−5.6 (21.9)	−4.2 (24.4)	4.2 (39.6)	17.5 (63.5)	26.3 (79.3)	31.9 (89.4)	34.1 (93.4)	31.5 (88.7)	24.9 (76.8)	14 (57)	4.5 (40.1)	−2.2 (28.0)	14.7 (58.5)
Daily mean °C (°F)	−9.6 (14.7)	−8.7 (16.3)	−0.6 (30.9)	11.4 (52.5)	19.4 (66.9)	24.8 (76.6)	27.2 (81.0)	24.4 (75.9)	17.9 (64.2)	8.2 (46.8)	0.3 (32.5)	−5.8 (21.6)	9.1 (48.3)
Mean daily minimum °C (°F)	−13.6 (7.5)	−13.2 (8.2)	−5.3 (22.5)	5.3 (41.5)	12.6 (54.7)	17.8 (64.0)	20.3 (68.5)	17.4 (63.3)	10.9 (51.6)	2.5 (36.5)	−3.9 (25.0)	−9.3 (15.3)	3.5 (38.2)
Average precipitation mm (inches)	12 (0.5)	9 (0.4)	15 (0.6)	17 (0.7)	12 (0.5)	6 (0.2)	5 (0.2)	5 (0.2)	6 (0.2)	14 (0.6)	14 (0.6)	16 (0.6)	131 (5.3)
Source: Climate-data.org

== Gallery ==
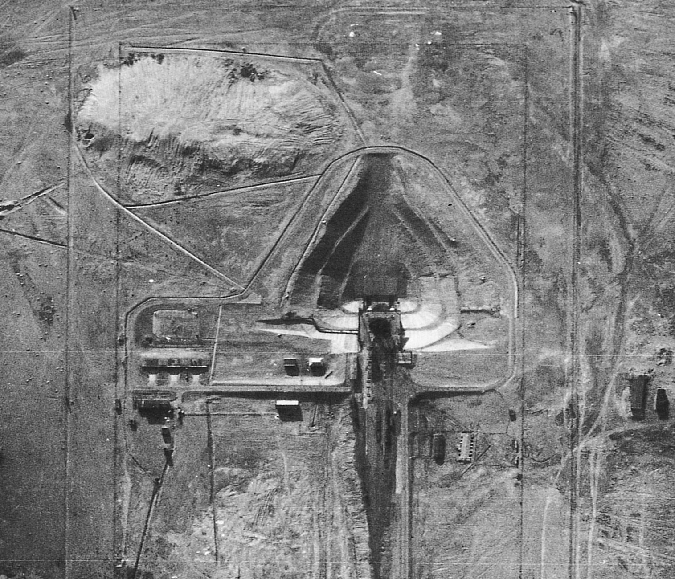
U-2 photograph of R-7 launch pad in Toretam

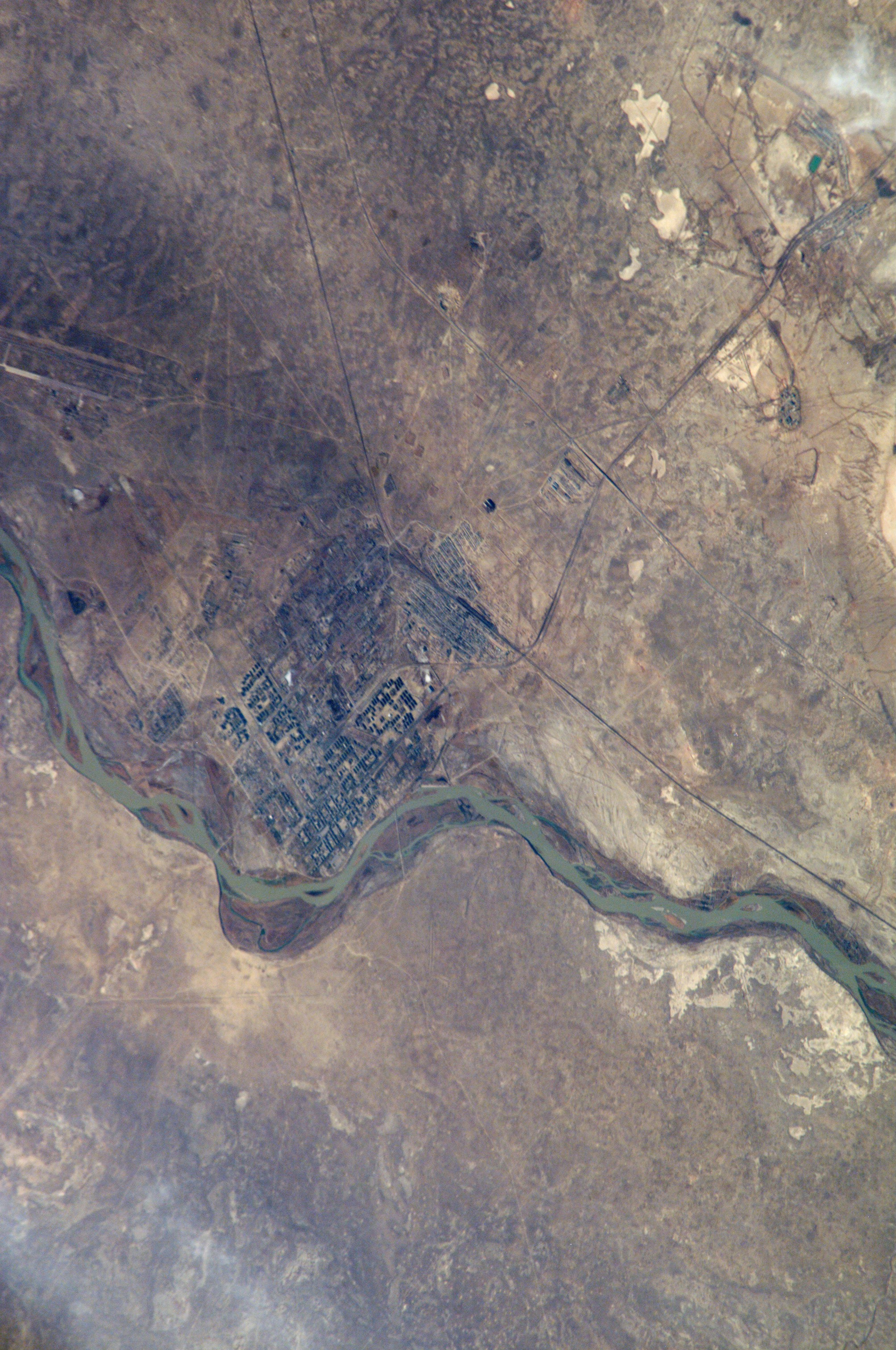
Baikonur and Syr Darya River

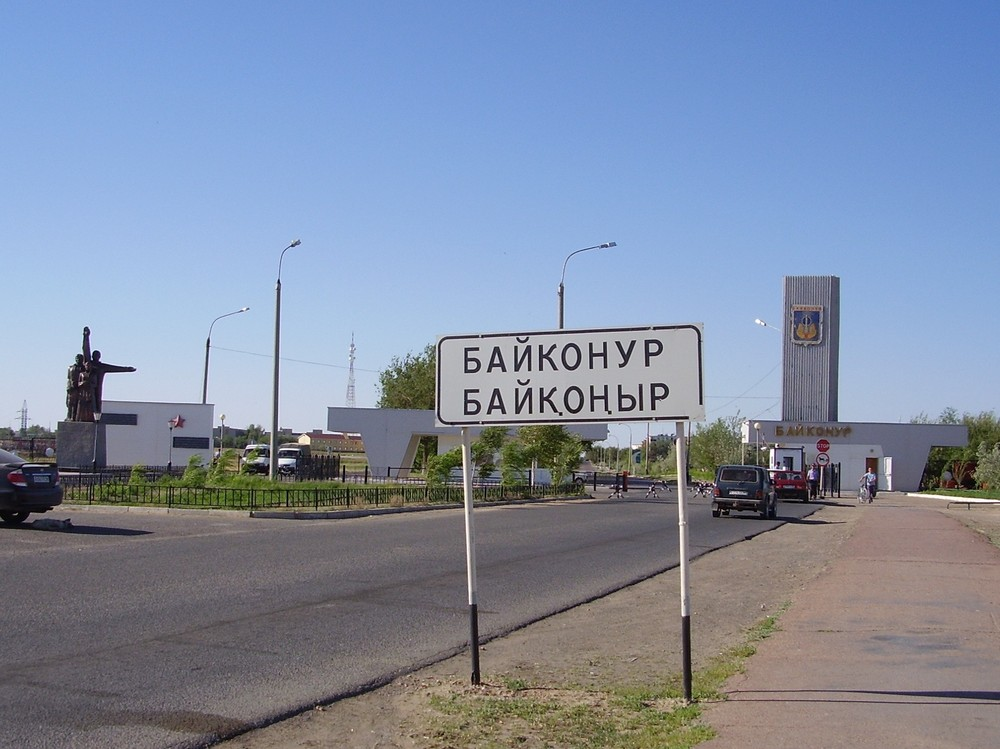
Entrance to the city

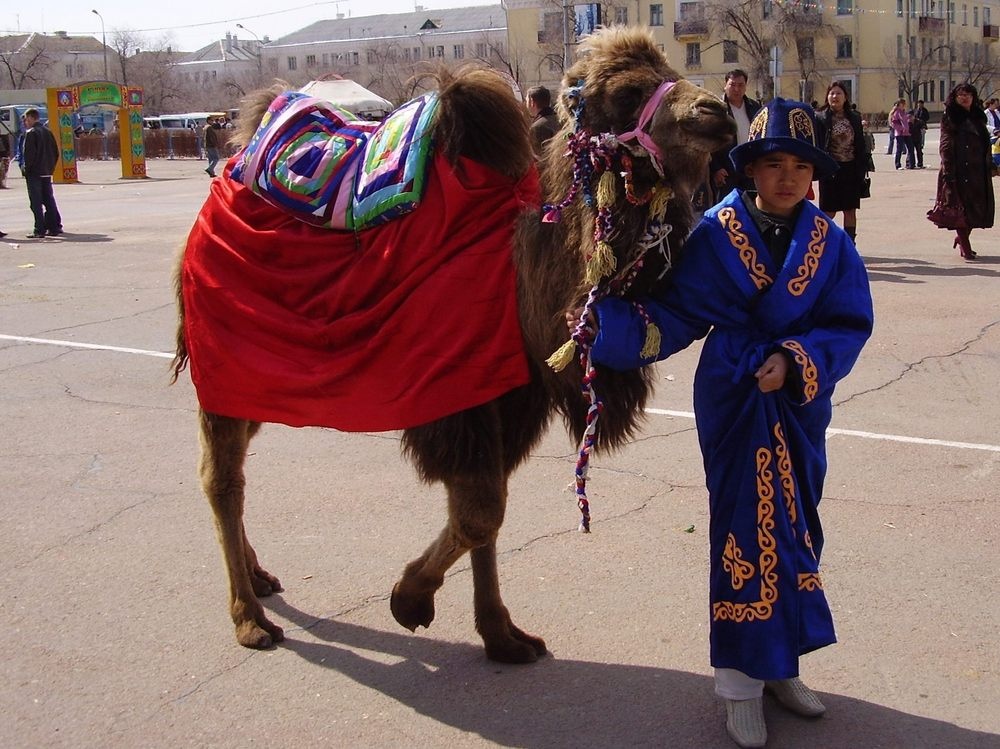
Kazakh boy wearing a national costume at the celebration of Nauryz event in Baikonur, with a camel

== See also ==
- List of closed cities
