= Great Russian Encyclopedia =

Universal encyclopedia in Russian

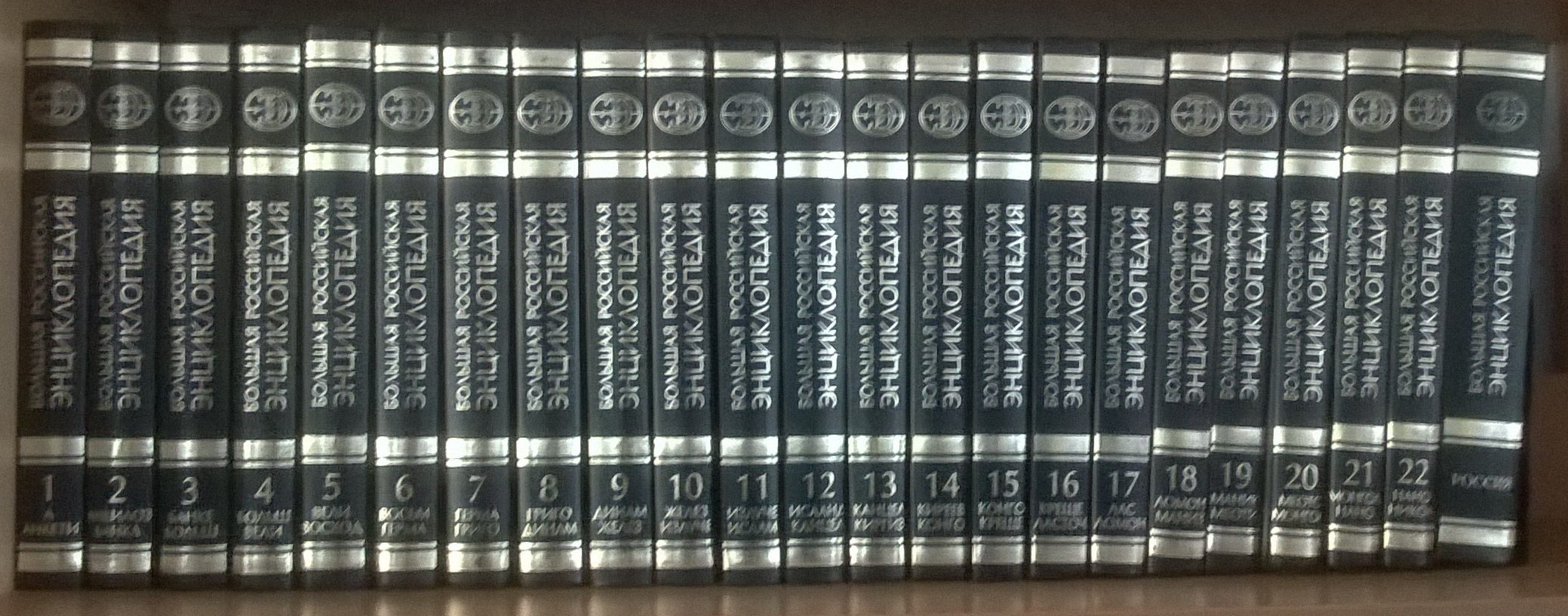
- Great Russian Encyclopedia in Vilnius University Library
- Editor: Yury Osipov (editor-in-chief)
- Illustrator: Several
- Language: Russian
- Subject: General
- Genre: Reference encyclopaedia
- Publisher: Great Russian Encyclopedia
- Publication date: 2004–2017
- Publication place: Russia
- Pages: Volume "Russia" – 1008, other volumes – on average 768
- Website: bigenc.ru

The Great Russian Encyclopedia (GRE; Russian: Большая российская энциклопедия, БРЭ, transliterated as Bolshaya rossiyskaya entsiklopediya or academically as Bol'šaja rossijskaja ènciklopedija) is a universal Russian encyclopedia, completed in 36 volumes, published between 2004 and 2017 by Great Russian Encyclopedia, JSC (Russian: Большая российская энциклопедия ПАО, transliterated as Bolshaya rossiyskaya entsiklopediya PAO). A successor to the Great Soviet Encyclopedia, it was released under the auspices of the Russian Academy of Sciences (RAS) after President Vladimir Putin signed a presidential decree №1156 in 2002. The complete edition was released by 2017.

The chief editor of the encyclopedia was Yury Osipov, the president of the RAS. The editorial board had more than 80 RAS members.

The first, introductory volume, released in 2004, was dedicated to Russia. Thirty-five volumes were released between 2005 and 2017, covering the range from "A" to "Яя" (Yaya). The RAS plans to publish an updated version every five years, although it may not be issued in print after the first edition.

On 17 June 2024 the project was suspended due to discontinued funding from the Russian government and by October 2024, its materials are being transferred to Ruwiki.

In December 2024 it was decreed to liquidate the autonomous nonprofit organization "Great Russian Encyclopedia" by October 20, 2025. In September 2025 the Russian government allocated over 300 million rubles to complete the liquidation. In particular, this money will be used to pay the unpaid salaries, for layoff payments, and for debt repayments.

== Personnel and management ==
=== Editorial board ===
Yury Osipov, a mathematician, President of RAS (1991–2013), is the GRE Editor in Chief and Chairman of the Scientific Editorial Board.

Managing editor is Sergey Kravets, journalist, editor and cultural figure.

Also in the scientific editorial board are or were:

- RAS Academics:

Sergey S. Averintsev, Eugene N. Avrorin, Sergei I. Adian, Yuri P. Altukhov, Zhores I. Alferov, Boris V. Anan'ich, Alexander F. Andreev, Leo N. Andreev, Dmitry V. Anosov, Vladimir I. Arnold, Sergey N. Bagaev, Nikolai Bahvalov, Oleg A. Bogatikov, Alexander A. Boyarchuk, Evgeny Velikhov, Vladimir A. Vinogradov, Andrei I. Vorobyov, Eric M. Galimov, Andrey V. Gaponov-Grekhov, Mikhail L. Gasparov, Vitaly L. Ginzburg, Georgy S. Golitsyn, Andrei A. Gonchar, Anatoly I. Grigoriev, Abdusalam A. Guseinov, Mikhail I. Davydov, Anatoly P. Derevyanko, Nikolai L. Dobretsov, Yuri I. Zhuravlev, Nicholas S. Zefirov, Yuri A. Zolotov, Viktor P. Ivannikov, Vadim T. Ivanov, Sergei G. Inge-Vechtomov, Alexander S. Isaev, Victor A. Kabanov, Eugene N. Kablov, Sergei P. Karpov, Lev L. Kiselev, Alex E. Kontorovich, Vladimir M. Kotlyakov, Oleg N. Krokhin, Edward P. Kruglyakov, Alexander B. Kudelin, Oleg Y. Kutafin, Nikolai P. Laverov, Viktor P. Legostaev, Nikolai P. Liakishev, Valery L. Makarov, Alexander M. Matveenko, Gennady A. Mesyats, Alexander D. Nekipelov, Alexei V. Nikolaev, Sergey P. Novikov, Yuri S. Osipov, Dmitry S. Pavlov, Alexey N. Parshin, Nikolai A. Plate, Nikolai N. Ponomarev-Steppe, Yuri V. Prokhorov, Alexei Y. Rozanov, Valery A. Rubakov, Alexander Y. Rumyantsev, Dmitry V. Rundkvist, Gennady I. Savin, Victor A. Sadovnichii, Alexander N. Skrinsky, Alexander S. Spirin, Yuri S. Stepanov, Vyacheslav S. Stepin, Michael L. Titarenko, Valery A. Tishkov, Yuri D. Tretyakov, Kliment N. Trubetskoy, Oleg H. Favorsky, Ludvig D. Faddeev, Vladimir Ye. Fortov, Konstantin V. Frolov, Yuri I. Chernov, Gorimir G. Chernii, Alexander O. Chubarian, Vitaly D. Shafranov, Sergey V. Shestakov, Dmitry V. Shirkov.

- RAS Corresponding Members:

Boris A. Babayan, Vladimir I. Vasiliev, Piama P. Gaidenko, Rudolf V. Kamelin, Michael V. Kovalchuk, Nikolai I. Lapin, Sergey S. Lappo, Alexey V. Yablokov.

- Russian Academy of Agricultural Sciences Academician:

Vladimir I. Fisinin.

- Russian Academy of Arts Academician:

Dmitry O. Shvidkovskiy.

- Russian Federation Statesmen:

Aleksandr A. Avdeyev (Culture Minister in 2008–2012),
Andrei A. Fursenko (Minister of Education and Science of the Russian Federation in 2004–2012),
Andrei A. Kokoshin (Secretary of the Russian Security Council in 1998),
Sergey E. Naryshkin (Head of the Presidential Administration of the Russian Federation in 2008–2011, Chairman of the State Duma of the Russian Federation since 2011),
Alexander S. Sokolov (musicologist, Culture Minister in 2004-2008),
Sergey K. Shoigu (Minister of Emergency Situations of the Russian Federation in 1994–2012, Defense Minister from 2012),
Mikhail E. Shvydkoi (Culture Minister in 2000–2004),
Alexander D. Zhukov (Deputy Prime Minister in 2004–2011).

- and also:

Alexei D. Bogaturov, Sergey V. Chemezov, Vladimir V. Grigoriev, Alexei I. Komech, Vladimir A. Mau, D. L. Orlov.

== Edition summary ==
Publication schedule and contents of volumes:

Vol.	Title (translit - translation)	Publication year	ISBN	pages
-	Россия (Rossija - Russia)	2004	ISBN 5-85270-326-5	1008
1	A (A); Анкетирование (Anketirovanie - Questionnaires)	2005	ISBN 5-85270-329-X	766
2	Анкилоз (Ankiloz - Ankylosis); Банка (Banka – Ocean bank)	2005	ISBN 5-85270-330-3	766
3	«Банкетная кампания» 1904 («Banketnaja kampanija» 1904 - Banquet Campaign of 1904); Большой Иргиз (Bol'shoj Irgiz)	2005	ISBN 5-85270-331-1	766
4	Большой Кавказ (Bol'shoj Kavkaz - Greater Caucasus); Великий канал (Velikij kanal - Great Channel)	2006	ISBN 5-85270-333-8	766
5	Великий князь (Velikij knjaz' – The Grand Duke); Восходящий узел орбиты (Voshodjashchij uzel orbity - ascending node of the orbit)	2006	ISBN 5-85270-334-6	786
6	Восьмеричный путь (Vos'merichnyj put' - Eightfold Path); Германцы (Germancy - Germanic peoples)	2006	ISBN 5-85270-335-4	768
7	Гермафродит (Germafrodit – Hermaphrodite); Григорьев (Grigor'ev - Grigoriev)	2007	ISBN 978-5-85270-337-8	767
8	Григорьев (Grigor'ev - Grigoriev); Динамика (Dinamika - Dynamics)	2007	ISBN 978-5-85270-338-5	767
9	Динамика атмосферы (Dinamika atmosfery - Dynamics of the atmosphere); Железнодорожный узел (Zheleznodorozhnyj uzel - Railway junction)	2007	ISBN 978-585270-339-2	767
10	Железное дерево (Zheleznoe derevo - Iron Tree); Излучение (Izluchenie - Radiation)	2008	ISBN 978-5-85270-341-5	767
11	Излучение плазмы (Izluchenie plazmy - Radiation plasma); Исламский фронт спасения (Islamskij front spasenija - the Islamic Salvation Front)	2008	ISBN 978-5-85270-342-2	767
12	Исландия (Islandija - Iceland); Канцеляризмы (Kanceljarizmy - Officialese)	2008	ISBN 978-5-85270-343-9	767
13	Канцелярия конфискации (Kanceljarija konfiskacii - Chancery of Confiscation); Киргизы (Kirgizy - Kirghiz)	2009	ISBN 978-5-85270-344-6	783
14	Киреев (Kireev - Kireyev); Конго (Kongo - Congo)	2009	ISBN 978-5-85270-345-3	751
15	Конго (Kongo - Congo); Крещение (Kreshchenie - Baptism)	2010	ISBN 978-5-85270-346-0	767
16	Крещение Господне (Kreshchenie Gospodne - Epiphany); Ласточковые (Lastochkovye - Hirundinidae)	2010	ISBN 978-5-85270-347-7	751
17	Лас-Тунас (Las-Tunas - Las Tunas); Ломонос (Lomonos - Clematis)	2011	ISBN 978-5-85270-350-7	751
18	Ломоносов (Lomonosov - Lomonosov); Манизер (Manizer - Manizer)	2011	ISBN 978-5-85270-351-4	768
19	Маниковский (Manikovskij - Iznikovsky); Меотида (Meotida - Maeotias)	2012	ISBN 978-5-85270-353-8	768
20	Меотская археологическая культура (Meotskaja arheologicheskaja kul'tura - Meotian archaeological culture); Монголо-татарское нашествие (Mongolo-tatarskoe nashestvie - Mongol-Tatar invasion)	2012	ISBN 978-5-85270-354-5	768
21	Монголы (Mongoly - Mongols); Наноматериалы (Nanomaterialy - Nanomaterials)	2013	ISBN 978-5-85270-355-2	768
22	Нанонаука (Nanonauka - Nanoscience); Николай Кавасила (Nikolaj Kavasila - Nicholas Kabasilas)	2013	ISBN 978-5-85270-358-3	767
23	Николай Кузанский (Nikolaj Kuzanskij - Nicholas of Cusa); Океан (Okean - Ocean)	2013	ISBN 978-5-85270-360-6	767
24	Океанариум (Okeanarium - Oceanarium); Оясио (Ojasio - Oyashio)	2014	ISBN 978-5-85270-361-3	767
25	П (P - П); Пертур (Pertur - Perturbation)	2014	ISBN 978-5-85270-362-0	765
26	Перу (Peru - Peru); Полуприцеп (Polupritsep - Semitrailer)	2014	ISBN 978-5-85270-363-7	767
27	Полупроводники (Poluprovodniki - Semiconductors); Пустыня (Pustynya - Desert)	2014	ISBN 978-5-85270-364-4	767
28	Пустырник (Pustyrnik - Motherwort); Румчерод (Rumcherod - Rumcherod)	2015	ISBN 978-5-85270-365-1	767
29	Румыния (Rumyniya - Romania); Сен-Жан-де-Люз (Sen-Zhan-de-Lyuz - Saint-Jean-de-Luz)	2015	ISBN 978-5-85270-366-8	767
30	Сен-Жерменский мир 1679 (Sen-Zhermenskiy mir 1679 - Saint-Germain Treaty 1679); Социальное обеспечение (Sotsial'noye obespecheniye - Social security)	2016	ISBN 978-5-85270-367-5	767
31	Социальное партнёрство (Sotsial'noye partnyorstvo - Social partnership); Телевидение (Televideniye - Television)	2016	ISBN 978-5-85270-368-2	768
32	Телевизионная башня (Televizionnaya bashnya - Television tower); Улан-Батор (Ulan-Bator - Ulaanbaatar)	2016	ISBN 978-5-85270-369-9	768
33	Уланд (Uland - Uhland); Хватцев (Khvatsev - Khvatsev)	2017	ISBN 978-5-85270-370-5	799
34	Хвойка (Khvoyka - Khvoyka); Шервинский (Shervinsky - Shervinsky)	2017	ISBN 978-5-85270-372-9	799
35	Шервуд (Shervud - Sherwood); Яя (Yaya - Yaya)	2017	ISBN 978-5-85270-373-6	799

== Electronic version ==
In 2022, an electronic version, the online Great Russian Encyclopedia was launched at bigenc.ru, described as a Russian government alternative to Wikipedia. Some assumed that this will be associated with blocking Wikipedia or competing with it, however Russian officials disavowed this claim.

== Criticism ==
While it was widely recognized that the Great Soviet Encyclopedia needed a replacement, the need for a print encyclopedia has been questioned, since many other analogues have now moved online, such as the Encyclopædia Britannica and the Brockhaus Enzyklopädie.

Critics complain that many of the biographies, historical entries, and cultural articles are narrow and biased: according to writer and literary critic Nikolai Podosokorsky, several of the articles are "quite superficial" and "the lists of references at the end were often extremely biased". While admitting that some of the articles in the encyclopedia were "excellent", Podosokorsky still stated that he maintained a generally negative view of the project.

== See also ==
- Grokipedia
