= MSU Faculty of Computational Mathematics and Cybernetics =

Faculty of Moscow State University

Coordinates: 55.6986°N 37.5317°E

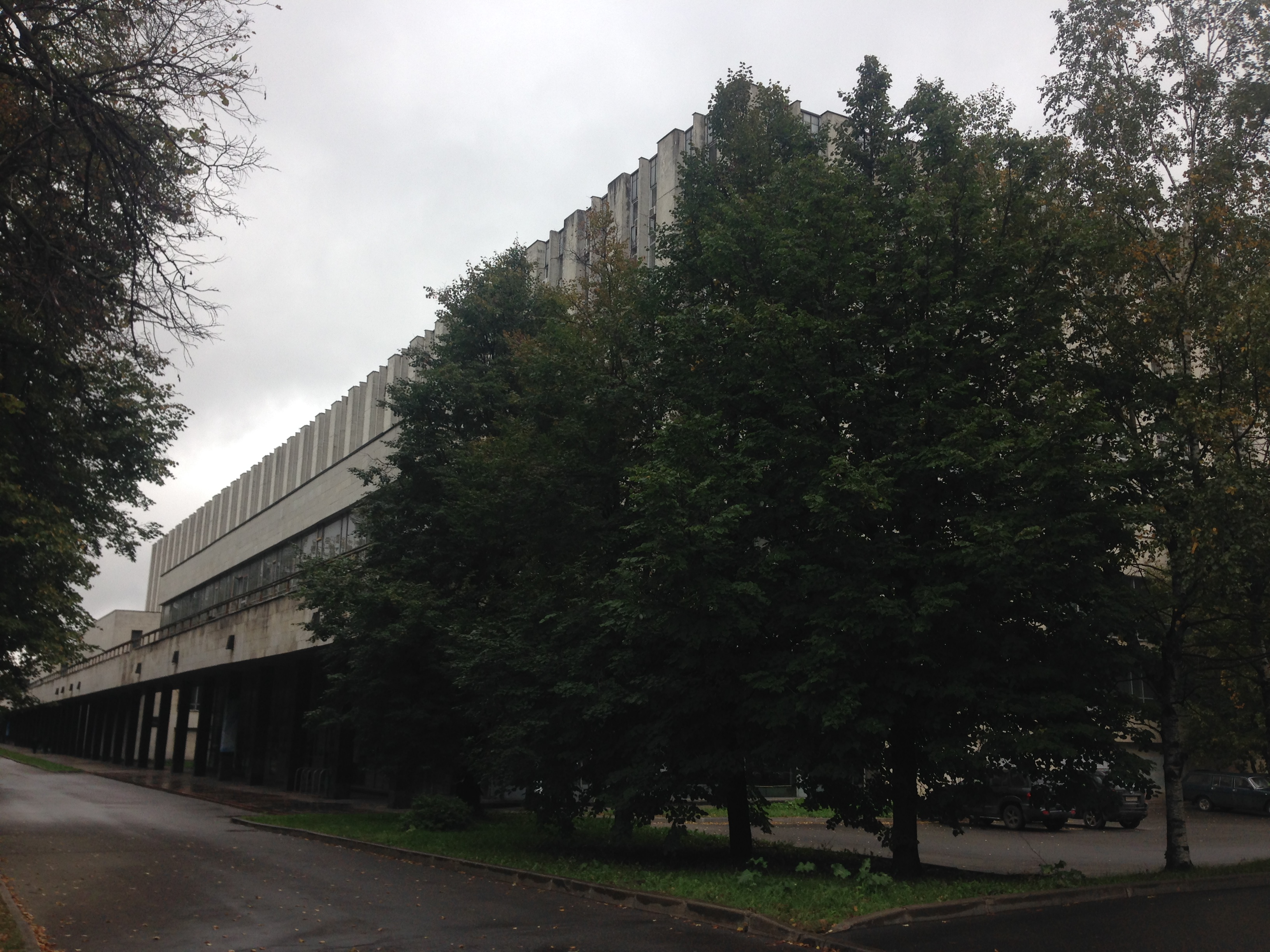
- Building of MSU CMC
- Type: Public
- Established: 1970
- Dean: Professor, Academician RAS; Igor Sokolov (scientist)
- Location: Moscow, Russia
- Campus: Urban
- Affiliations: MSU
- Website: en.cs.msu.ru

MSU Faculty of Computational Mathematics and Cybernetics (CMC) (Russian: Факультет вычислительной математики и кибернетики (ВМК)), founded in 1970 by Andrey Tikhonov, is a part of Moscow State University.

== Education ==
CMC is a Russian research and training center in the fields of applied mathematics, computing and software development . Education at CMC combines theoretical studies, practical exercises, and research.

Main 12 Master's programs:

- Mathematical physics
- Mathematical modeling
- Computational diagnostics
- Numerical methods
- Theory of probability and mathematical statistics
- Operations research and systems analysis
- Optimization and optimal control
- Mathematical cybernetics
- Software for computers and computer systems
- Networks software
- System programming
- Decision making in Economics and Finance

== History ==
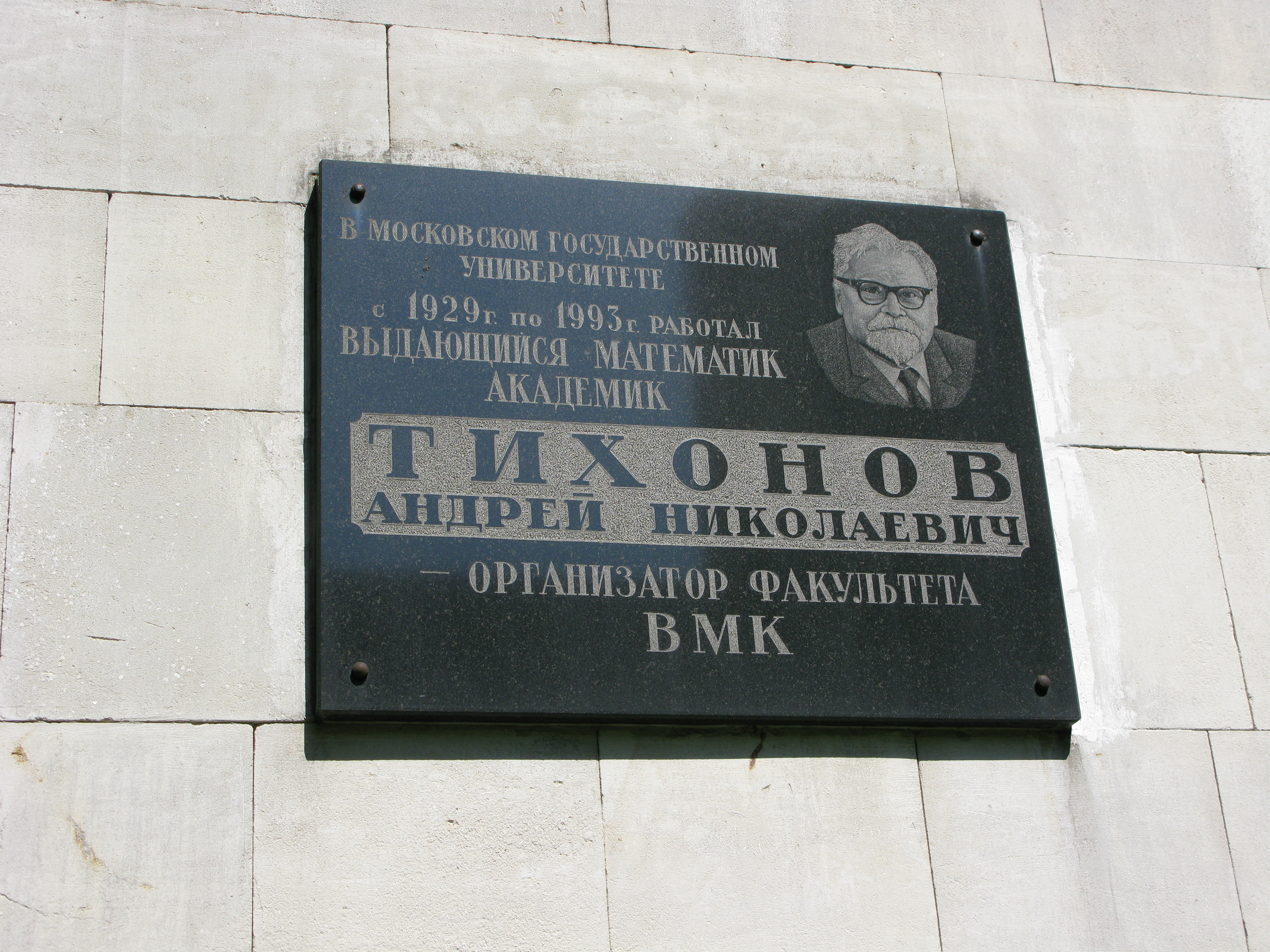
Memorial board of Andrey Tikhonov on the building of MSU Faculty of Computational Mathematics and Cybernetics

A group of professors and scholars from Department of Physics and Department of Mechanics and Mathematics led by Andrey Tikhonov founded CMC in 1970. The three departments are still closely connected.

The faculty houses the 33,072-processor Lomonosov supercomputer in Moscow. The system was designed by T-Platforms, and used Xeon 2.93 GHz processors, Nvidia 2070 GPUs, and an Infiniband interconnect. Following companies work with CS MSU: Intel, Microsoft, Sun Microsystems, Borland, Software AG, Siemens, IBM/Lotus, Samsung, HP.

Following the school's support for the 2022 Russian invasion of Ukraine, Intel and AMD, the largest chip manufacturers in the world, whose processors are used in the Moscow State University supercomputer, as well as NVIDIA, reacted by suspending deliveries of their processors to Russia.

== Deans ==
The deans of the faculty:

- Andrey Tikhonov (1970–1990)
- Dmitrij Kostomarov (1991–1999)
- Evgeny Moiseev (1999-2019)
- Igor Sokolov (since March 2019)

== Structure ==
=== Departments ===
The faculty consists of 19 Academic departments:

| Department | Head | Year of creation |
|---|---|---|
| Department of Mathematical Physics | Alexander Denisov | 1982 |
| Department of Computational Technologies and Modeling | Evgeny Tyrtyshnikov | 2004 |
| Department of Computational Methods | Boris Chetverushkin | 1983 |
| Department of Automation for Scientific Research | Aleksandr Popov | 1987 |
| Department of General Mathematics | | 1973 |
| Department of Functional Analysis and its Applications | Evgeny Moiseev | 2008 |
| Department of Nonlinear Dynamic Systems and Control Processes | Stanislav Emelyanov | 1989 |
| Department of Operations Research | Alexander Vasin | 1970 |
| Department of Optimal Control | Yury Osipov | 1970 |
| Department of Systems Analysis | Aleksandr Kurzhanskij | 1992 |
| Department of Mathematical Statistics | Viktor Korolev | 1970 |
| Department of Mathematical Methods of Forecasting | Yuri Zhuravlyov | 1997 |
| Department of Mathematical Cybernetics | Valerij Alekseev | 1970 |
| Department of Information Security | Igor Sokolov | 2013 |
| Department of Computing Systems and Automation | Ruslan Smelyansky | 1970 |
| Department of Supercomputers and Quantum Informatics | Vladimir Voevodin | 2012 |
| Department of Algorithmic Languages | Natalia Loukashevich | 1970 |
| Department of System Programming | Arutyun I. Avetisyan | 1970 |
| Department of Intellectual Information Technologies | Igor Mashechkin | 2017 |
| Department of English | Larisa Saratovskaya | 1990 |

=== Scientific laboratories ===
The faculty includes 18 research laboratories:

- Laboratory of Mathematical Physics
- Laboratory of Computational Electrodynamics
- Laboratory of Heat and Mass Transfer Processes Simulation
- Laboratory of Inverse Problems
- Laboratory of Mathematical Methods of Image Processing
- Laboratory of Mathematical Modeling in Physics
- Laboratory of Difference Methods
- Open Laboratory of Information Technologies
- Laboratory of Statistical Analysis
- Laboratory of Mathematical Problems of Computer Security
- Laboratory of Computational Practice and Information Systems
- The Computer Systems Laboratory
- Laboratory of Information Systems Security
- Computer Graphics and Multimedia Laboratory
- Laboratory of Programming Technologies
- Laboratory of Ternary Informatics
- Research Laboratory of Computational Modeling Tools
- Laboratory of Industrial Mathematics

== Рrofessors ==
Faculty staff consists of more than 550 professors and research scientists. The list of scientists that worked in the Faculty of Computational Mathematics and Cybernetics includes:

- Lev Pontryagin, the founder and the first chair of the department of Optimal Control.
- Sergey Yablonsky, the founder and the first chair of the department of Mathematical Cybernetics.
- Oleg Lupanov, who was affiliated with the department of Mathematical Cybernetics and taught the undergraduate course on discrete mathematics.
- Yuriy Prokhorov, the chair of the department of Probability Theory and Mathematical Statistics.
- Guriy Marchuk, the chair of the department of Computational Technologies and Modeling.

Scientists have worked and are working at the faculty in different years:

- Andrey Tikhonov (1970–1993)
- Lev Pontryagin (1970–1988)
- Sergey Yablonsky (1970–1998)
- Oleg Lupanov (1970–1980)
- Lev Korolyov (1970–2016)
- Yuriy Prokhorov (1970–2013)
- Guriy Marchuk (2004–2013)
- Nikolai Bakhvalov (1970–1981)
- Evgenij D'yakonov (1970–2006)
- Viktor Sadovnichiy (1981–1982)
- Yury Osipov (1989-now)
- Yuri Zhuravlyov (1997-2022)
- Viktor Ivannikov (1994-2016)

== Graduates ==
- Sergei Abramov
- Nikolai Ardelyan
- Aram Arutyunov
- Sergei Aseev,
- Sergey Aslanyan
- Vladimir Bening
- Natalia Berloff
- Peter Brusilovsky
- Vasily Denisov
- Alexander Dyakonov
- Aleksey Ismailov
- Alexander Ilyin
- Dmitry Jakovenko
- Nikolai Kapustin
- Viktor Korolev
- Maria Korovina
- Andrei Krylov
- Igor Lomov
- Sergey Lozhkin
- Allan Martinson
- Igor Mashechkin
- Tikhon Moiseev
- Sergei Mukhin
- Yurii Nesterov
- Sergey Orlovskiy
- Mikhail Potapov
- Alexander Razgulin
- Svetlana Selezneva
- Irina Shevtsova
- Alexey Shishkin
- Sergey Shorgin
- Ruslan Smelyansky
- Igor Sokolov
- Sergey Solovyov
- Dmitry Sychugov
- Evgeny Tyrtyshnikov
- Alexander Vasin
- Vladimir Voevodin
- Andrey Voronenko
- Tatyana Yumasheva
- Vladimir Zakharov
- Fedor Zaytsev

== Literature ==
- Matveeva A.N., ed. (2005). 20 years later (1985-2005): Graduates of the Olympic set - Festival edition: Collected essays. Moscow: MAX Press. p. 560. ISBN 5-317-01277-5.
- Evgeny Grigoriev (2010). Faculty of Computational Mathematics and Cybernetics: History and Modernity: A Biographical Directory. Moscow: Publishing house of Moscow University. p. 616. ISBN 978-5-211-05838-5.
- Zhdaneeva L.A.; Matveeva A.N.; Mikhailova L.G., eds. (2015). 30 years later (1985-2015): Graduates of the Olympic set - Festival edition: Collected essays. Moscow: MAX Press. p. 704. ISBN 978-5-317-04999-7.
