= Vladimir Voevodin =

Russian computer scientist (1962–2026)

- Владимир Воеводин
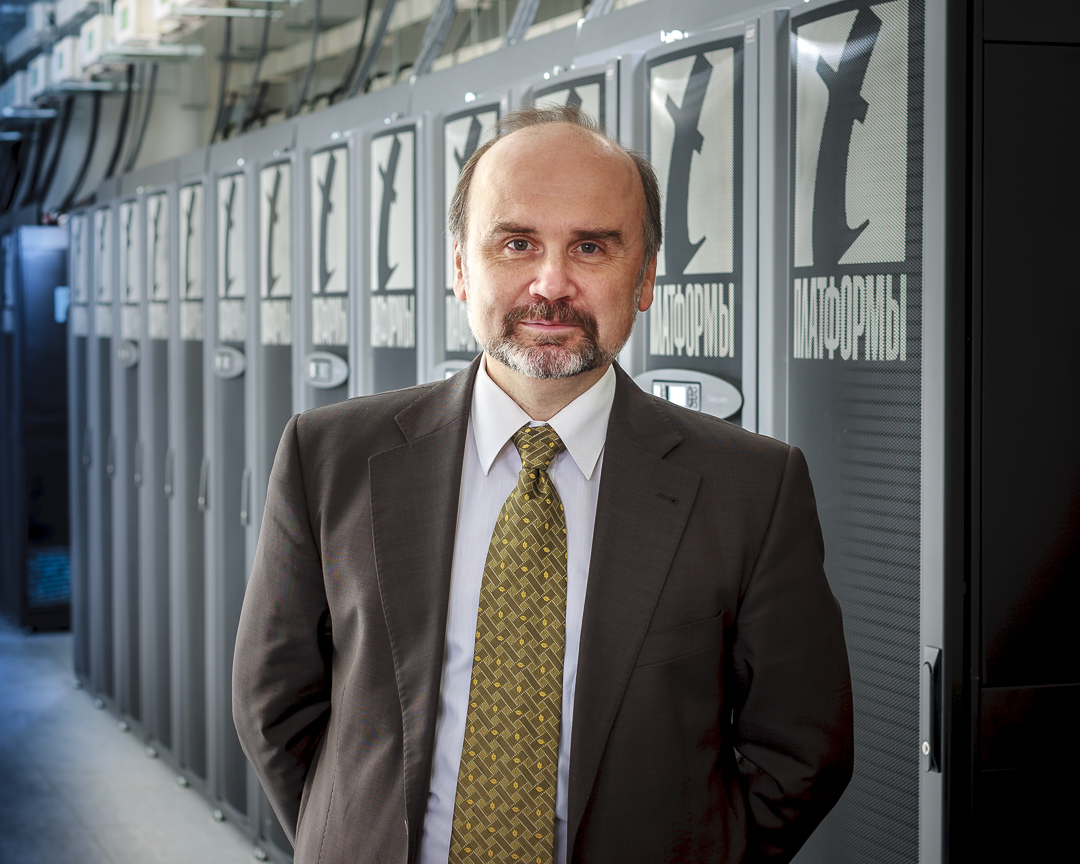
- Voevodin with the Lomonosov Supercomputer in the background, 2010
- Born: 25 May 1962; Moscow, Russian SFSR, Soviet Union
- Died: 29 April 2026 (aged 63)
- Education: Corresponding Member RAS (2003)
- Alma mater: Moscow State University (1984)
- Scientific career
- Fields: Computer Science
- Workplaces: MSU CMC
- Doctoral advisor: Viktor Ivannikov

Vladimir Valentinovich Voevodin (Russian: Владимир Валентинович Воеводин, IPA: [vladimir voevodin]; 25 May 1962 – 29 April 2026) was a Russian computer scientist and academic who was a professor at Lomonosov Moscow State University, the Faculty of Computational Mathematics and Cybernetics (MSU CMC), Deputy Director of MSU Research Computing Center, corresponding member of the Russian Academy of Sciences, Professor, Dr.Sc.

== Life and career ==
In 1979, after finishing high school (physical-mathematical school No. 52, Moscow), Vladimir Voevodin entered Moscow State University, the Faculty of Computational Mathematics and Cybernetics, from which he graduated with honours in 1984. He received his Candidate of Sciences degree in Physics and Mathematics in 1989 for a thesis entitled «Macroanalysis of Parallel Structure of Sequential Programs and Algorithms». In 1990 he obtained a degree of Doctor of Science in Physics and Mathematics for his doctoral thesis «Analytical and practical methods for investigation of fine structure of applications». In 2003 he was elected corresponding member of the Russian Academy of Sciences.

Voevodin served at MSU since 1984. He started his career in the Computer Systems Laboratory, then, in 1990, he began working in the Research Computing Center (MSU RCC), first as a research associate, then as a senior research associate until taking up his position of Deputy Director of the MSU RCC in 1990. In 2013 Vladimir Voevodin was appointed the Head of Supercomputers and Quantum Informatics Department, MSU CMC.

From 1988, Voevodin was a professor at the Faculty of Computational Mathematics and Cybernetics, MSU. He held a course «Parallel Data Processing» and headed a special seminar «Parallel Computing». Vladimir Voevodin was one of the organizers of the MSU Educational and Scientific Center of High-Performance Computing.

He was the head of Informational Analytical Center on Parallel Computing. Voevodin made 65 reports at scientific conferences and has obtained 9 rights certificates to software. He supervised 10 Ph.Ds.

Voevodin died on 29 April 2026, at the age of 63.

== Research area ==
Parallel computing, mathematical methods for research of program fine structures, methods for description and analysis of computer architecture, parallel programming technology, program optimization methods for supercomputers and parallel computing systems, the Internet-based technology and organization of distributed computing, metacomputing.

== Awards and honours ==
Voevodin won MSU Shuvalov Prize for his series of papers “Analytical and practical methods for investigation of fine structure of applications" in 2000. He was awarded the Russian Federation Government Prize in education in 2002 and Lomonosov Prize for teaching activity in 2015. He was also Honoured Worker of Higher Education of the Russian Federation and a winner of Russian Federation President contest of grants for young Doctors of Science.
