= Tikhon Moiseev =

Russian mathematician

- Born: 14 August 1978 (age 48); Moscow
- Education: Moscow State University (2000)
- Scientific career
- Fields: Mathematics
- Workplaces: MSU CMC

Tikhon Yevgenyevich Moiseev (Russian: Ти́хон Евге́ньевич Моисе́ев; born 1978) is a Russian mathematician, Professor, Dr.Sc., a professor at the Faculty of Computer Science at the Moscow State University. Corresponding Member of the Russian Academy of Sciences.

He defended the thesis "On the solvability of boundary value problems for the Lavrent'ev-Bitsadze equation with mixed boundary conditions" for the degree of Doctor of Physical and Mathematical Sciences (2013).

Author more than 50 scientific articles.

He is the son of famed mathematician Evgeny Moiseev.

== Bibliography ==
- Evgeny Grigoriev (2010). Faculty of Computational Mathematics and Cybernetics: History and Modernity: A Biographical Directory (1 500 экз ed.). Moscow: Publishing house of Moscow University. pp. 131–132. ISBN 978-5-211-05838-5.
