= Vasily Denisov =

Russian mathematician

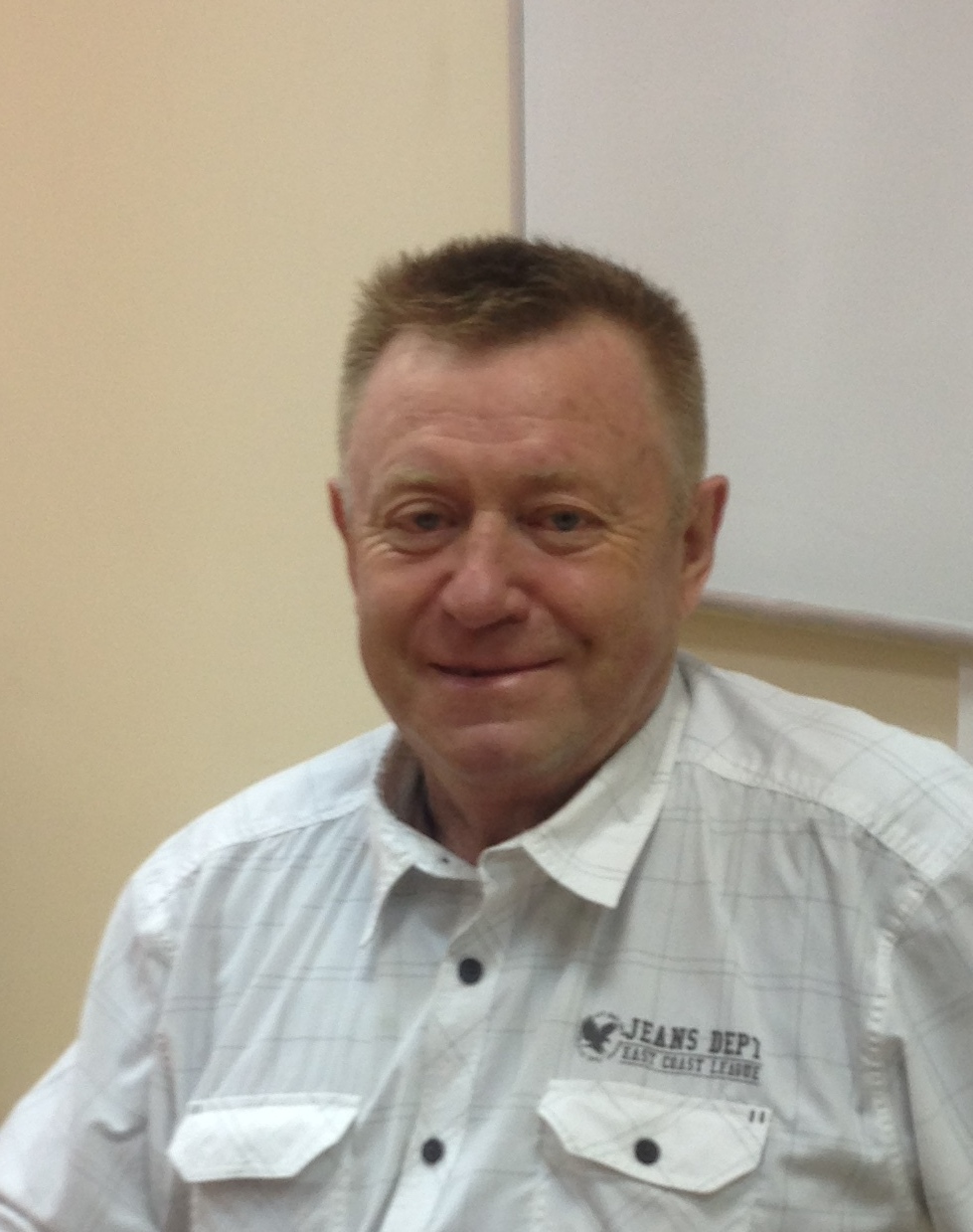
- Vasily Denisov (2018)
- Born: 1 January 1951 (age 75); Zaporizhia Oblast
- Education: Moscow State University (D.Sc.)
- Scientific career
- Fields: Mathematics
- Workplaces: MSU CMC
- Thesis: On the behavior for large values of the time of solutions of parabolic equations (2011)
- Doctoral advisor: Vladimir Ilyin

Vasily Denisov (Russian: Васи́лий Никола́евич Дени́сов) (born 1951) is a Russian mathematician, Dr.Sc., Professor, a professor at the Faculty of Computer Science at the Moscow State University.

He graduated from the faculty MSU CMC (1976).

He defended the thesis "On the behavior for large values of the time of solutions of parabolic equations" for the degree of Doctor of Physical and Mathematical Sciences (2011).

He is the author of four books and more than 90 scientific articles.

Area of scientific interests: stabilization of solutions of the Cauchy problem and boundary value problems for parabolic equations; qualitative theory of partial differential equations.

== Bibliography ==
- Faculty of Computational Mathematics and Cybernetics: History and Modernity: A Biographical Directory (1 500 экз ed.). Moscow: Publishing house of Moscow University. 2010. pp. 174–175. ISBN 978-5-211-05838-5 – via Author-compiler Evgeny Grigoriev.
