= Irina Shevtsova =

Russian mathematician

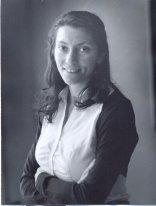
- Born: 18 February 1983 (age 43); Mineralnye Vody, Russian SFSR, Soviet Union
- Education: Moscow State University (2004)
- Scientific career
- Fields: Mathematics
- Workplaces: MSU CMC
- Doctoral advisor: Viktor Korolev

Irina Shevtsova (Russian: Ири́на Генна́дьевна Шевцо́ва, born 1983) is a Russian mathematician, Dr.Sc., and Professor at Moscow State University.

She graduated from the faculty MSU CMC (2004). She has been working at the Moscow State University since 2006. She defended the thesis "Optimization of the structure of moment estimates of the accuracy of normal approximation for distributions of sums of independent random variables" for the degree of Doctor of Physical and Mathematical Sciences in 2013.

Svetsova is the author of two books and more than 70 scientific articles. Her areas of research include central limit theorems of probability theory, estimates of the rate of convergence, and the analytical methods of probability theory. A number of papers are devoted to refinement of estimates of the rate of convergence in the central limit theorem for sums of independent random variables under different instantaneous conditions, and also to the study of regular and asymptotically regular constants in these estimates. In particular, the upper bound for the absolute constant in the classical Berry-Esseen inequality is refined, and two-sided estimates for asymptotically regular constants in the Berry-Essen inequality are obtained in the absence of the third moment.

== Bibliography ==
- Grigoriev, Evgeny, ed. (2010). Faculty of Computational Mathematics and Cybernetics: History and Modernity: A Biographical Directory. Moscow: Publishing house of Moscow University. pp. 325–326. ISBN 978-5-211-05838-5.
