= Sergei Aseev =

Russian mathematician

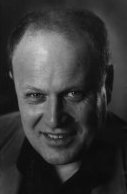
- Born: 4 December 1957; Potsdam
- Education: Moscow State University (1980)
- Scientific career
- Fields: Mathematics
- Workplaces: Steklov Institute of Mathematics, MSU CMC

Sergei Mironovich Aseev (Russian: Сергéй Миро́нович Асéев; born 4 December 1957) is a Russian mathematician, Dr. Sc., Professor, and a Corresponding Member of the Russian Academy of Sciences.

He graduated from the faculty of MSU CMC in 1980.

He defended the thesis «Extremal problems for differential inclusions with phase constraints» for the degree of Doctor of Physical and Mathematical Sciences (1998).

Was awarded the title of Corresponding Member of the Russian Academy of Sciences (2008).

Author of 1 book and more than 30 scientific articles.

Area of scientific interests: The theory of multivalued mappings, optimal control, and mathematical models in economics.

== Literature ==
- Faculty of Computational Mathematics and Cybernetics: History and Modernity: A Biographical Directory (1 500 экз ed.). Moscow: Publishing house of Moscow University. 2010. pp. 272–274. ISBN 978-5-211-05838-5 – via Author-compiler Evgeny Grigoriev.
