= Ruslan Smelyansky =

Russian mathematician and professor (born 1950)

- Руслан Смелянский
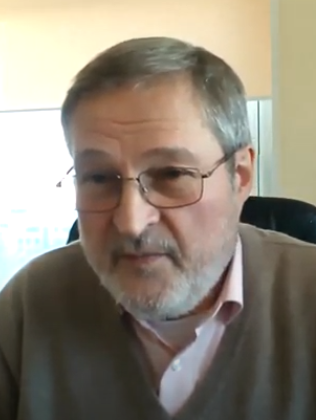
- Smelyansky in 2020
- Born: 12 November 1950 (age 75); Moscow, Russian SFSR, Soviet Union
- Education: Moscow State University (1977)
- Scientific career
- Fields: Mathematics
- Workplaces: MSU CMC
- Doctoral advisor: Lev Korolyov

Ruslan Leonidovich Smelyansky (Russian: Руслан Леонидович Смелянский; born 12 November 1950) is a Russian mathematician, Dr. Sc., Professor, a professor at the Faculty of Computer Science at the Moscow State University, Corresponding Member of the Russian Academy of Sciences.

He defended the thesis «Analysis of the performance of multiprocessor systems based on the invariant behavior of programs» for the degree of Doctor of Physical and Mathematical Sciences (1990). He is the author of six books.

== Bibliography ==
- Grigoriev, Evgeny (2010). Faculty of Computational Mathematics and Cybernetics: History and Modernity: A Biographical Directory. Moscow: Publishing house of Moscow University. pp. 442–444. ISBN 978-5-211-05838-5.
