= Yuri Zhuravlyov =

Yuri Zhuravlyov may refer to:

- Yuri Zhuravlyov (footballer) (born 1996), Russian football player
- Yuri Zhuravlyov (mathematician) (born 1935), Russian mathematician
