= Lev Korolyov (scientist) =

Computer scientist from USSR/Russia

- Лев Королёв
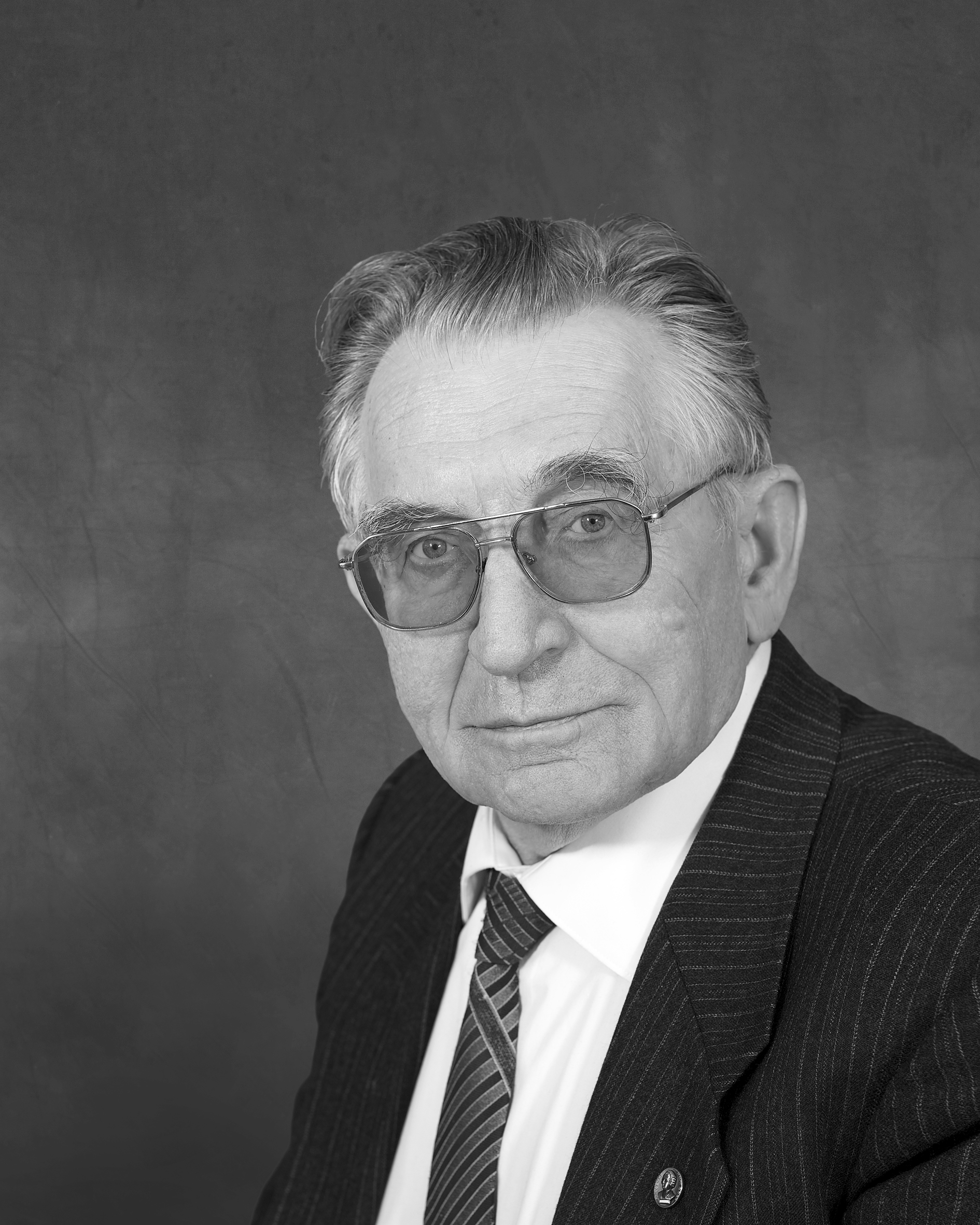
- Korolyov in 2011
- Born: 6 September 1926 (age 99); Podolsk, Soviet Union
- Died: 5 January 2016 (aged 89); Moscow, Russia
- Education: Moscow State University
- Scientific career
- Fields: System software; computer science; computer architecture; operating systems
- Workplaces: MSU CMC
- Doctoral advisor: Sergey Lebedev
- Doctoral students: Ruslan Smelyansky, Igor Mashechkin, Peter Brusilovsky

Lev Nikolayevich Korolyov (also Korolev, Russian: Лев Николаевич Королёв; 6 September 1926 – 5 January 2016) was a Soviet and Russian computer scientist, corresponding member of the USSR Academy of Sciences. He was involved in the development of the first Soviet computers.

== Biography ==
Korolev was born in Podolsk, Russia. After Army service, he graduated from Faculty of Mechanics and Mathematics, Moscow State University in 1952. From 1953 to 1975, Korolev worked at the Institute of Precise Mechanics and Computer Engineering of academician S.A. Lebedev, and became his deputy. He died in Moscow in 2016 at the age of 89.

== Professional career ==
He worked on the development of software for the BESM built in 1953, the first large Russian computer, and its subsequent models

In 1956 Korolev created one of the first programs for the BESM for machine translation of written text from English into Russian. In 1960 he was awarded the degree Candidate of Sciences in Physics and Mathematics for a thesis on the theory of machine translation.

He headed the team which wrote control software for ballistic missile defense, using the computers M-40 and M-50. For this research, Korolev was awarded doctorate in 1967. His team produced the first operating system for BESM-6, a batch processing system later named "Dispatcher-68".

In 1981 Korolev was elected a corresponding member of the USSR Academy of Sciences at the Department of Mathematics.

Korolev has held a chair at the Moscow State University Department of Computational Mathematics and Cybernetics since its founding in 1970.

Korolev wrote over 80 scientific publications, including 10 monographs and textbooks. Two of them, Structures of Electronic Computers and their mathematical basis, Moscow, ‘Nauka', 1974 (2nd ed., 1978) and Microprocessors, micro- and mini-computer, Moscow, ‘Nauka', 1984 are the most significant. Among his students are two academicians of the Russian Academy of Sciences and over 40 scientists with Doctor of Sciences and Candidate of Sciences degrees. In 1997 L .N. Korolev was awarded "Honorable professorship of the MSU".

Korolev received the USSR State Prize (1969), the Prize of the USSR Council of Ministers (1982), the Lomonosov Prize of the MSU (1995), the Order of Lenin, Order of the October Revolution, and the Order of the Patriotic War.
