= Kapustin =

Kapustin (Russian: Капустин) and Kapustina (Russian: Капустина; feminine) is a common Russian surname. It is derived from the sobriquet "капуста" (cabbage). Notable people with the surname include:

- Anton Kapustin (born 1971), professor of theoretical physics at Caltech
- Denis Kapustin (athlete) (born 1970), Russian triple jumper
- Denis Kapustin (militant) (born 1984), Russian-born Ukrainian paramilitary leader
- Nikolai Kapustin (1937–2020), Soviet pianist and composer
- Nikolai Kapustin (mathematician) (born 1957), Russian mathematician
- Sergei Kapustin (1953–1995), Soviet ice hockey player

== See also ==
- Kapustin Yar, a rocket launch and development site in Russia
