= Maria Korovina =

Russian mathematician (born 1962)

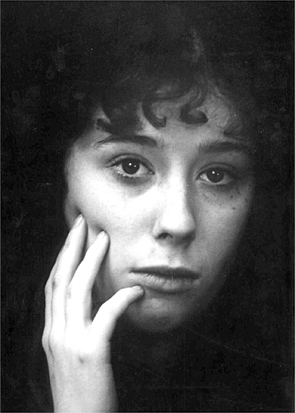
- Born: 14 June 1962 (age 64); Moscow
- Education: Moscow State University (1985)
- Scientific career
- Fields: Mathematics
- Workplaces: MSU CMC
- Doctoral advisor: Evgeny Moiseev

Maria Korovina (Russian: Мари́я Ви́кторовна Коро́вина; born 1962) is a Russian mathematician, Professor, Dr. Sc., a professor at the Faculty of Computer Science at the Moscow State University.

She defended the thesis «Elliptic problems in spaces with asymptotics and their applications to the construction of self-adjoint extensions of the Laplace operator» for the degree of Doctor of Physical and Mathematical Sciences (1992).

The author of the monograph «The theory of functional spaces and differential equations» (2007) and more than 70 scientific articles.

== Bibliography ==
- Evgeny Grigoriev (2010). Faculty of Computational Mathematics and Cybernetics: History and Modernity: A Biographical Directory (1 500 экз ed.). Moscow: Publishing house of Moscow University. pp. 166–167. ISBN 978-5-211-05838-5.
