= Igor Lomov =

Russian mathematician (born 1956)

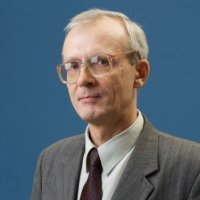
- Born: 6 October 1956 (age 69); Moscow
- Education: Moscow State University (1978)
- Scientific career
- Fields: Mathematics
- Workplaces: MSU CMC
- Doctoral advisor: Vladimir Ilyin

Igor Lomov (Russian: Игорь Серге́евич Ло́мов) (born 1956) is a Russian mathematician, Professor, Dr.Sc., a professor at the Faculty of Computer Science at the Moscow State University.

He defended the thesis «Mathematical modeling and computer analysis of liquid metal systems» for the degree of Doctor of Physical and Mathematical Sciences (2009).

Author of 13 books and more than 90 scientific articles.

== Bibliography ==
- Grigoriev, Evgeny (2010). Faculty of Computational Mathematics and Cybernetics: History and Modernity: A Biographical Directory. Moscow: Publishing house of Moscow University. pp. 167–168. ISBN 978-5-211-05838-5.
