= Alexander Dyakonov =

Russian mathematician (born 1979)

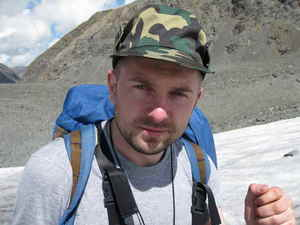
- Born: 13 July 1979 (age 47); Moscow
- Education: Moscow State University (2001)
- Scientific career
- Fields: Mathematics
- Workplaces: MSU CMC
- Doctoral advisor: Yuri Zhuravlyov

Alexander Dyakonov (Russian: Алекса́ндр Генна́дьевич Дья́конов) (born 1979) is a Russian mathematician, Professor, Dr.Sc., a professor at the Faculty of Computer Science at the Moscow State University. Professor of the Russian Academy of Sciences. Multiple winner of international competitions in applied data analysis.

He defended the thesis «Algebraic closures of the generalized model of recognition algorithms based on the calculation of estimates» for the degree of Doctor of Physical and Mathematical Sciences (2010).

Author of two books and more than 50 scientific articles.

== Bibliography ==
- Faculty of Computational Mathematics and Cybernetics: History and Modernity: A Biographical Directory (1 500 экз ed.). Moscow: Publishing house of Moscow University. 2010. pp. 358–359. ISBN 978-5-211-05838-5 – via Author-compiler Evgeny Grigoriev.
