= Mikhail Potapov =

Mikhail Potapov may refer to:

- Mikhail Feofanovich Potapov (1921–1943), Soviet Red Army artillery captain
- Mikhail Potapov (mathematician), Russian mathematician
