= Vladimir Zakharov =

Vladimir Zakharov may refer to:

- Vladimir Zakharov (mathematician) (born 1960), Russian mathematician, professor at the Faculty of Computer Science at the Moscow State University
- Vladimir E. Zakharov (1939–2023), Russian mathematician and theoretical physicist
- Vladimir Zakharov (composer) (1901–1956), Soviet composer
- Vladimir Ivanovich Zakharov (born 1961), Belarusian guitarist
- Vladimir Mikhailovich Zakharov (1946–2013), Russian choreographer

== See also ==
- Vladimir Sakharov (footballer) (born 1948), former Soviet footballer
- Vladimir Sakharov (general) (1853–1920), general of the Russian Imperial Army
