= Igor Sokolov (scientist) =

- Игорь Соколов
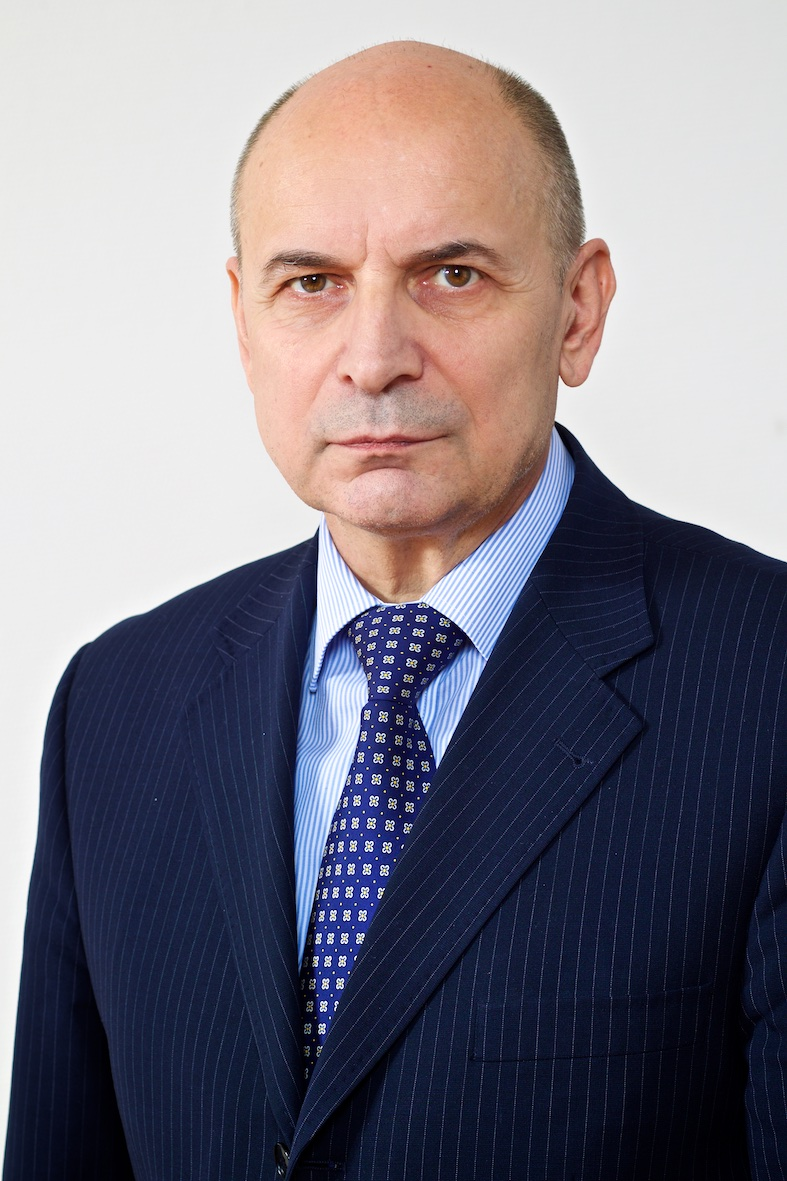
- Born: 27 March 1954 (age 72); Tambov
- Education: Full Member RAS (2008)
- Alma mater: Moscow State University (1976)
- Scientific career
- Fields: Mathematics
- Workplaces: Moscow Technological University (MIREA), MSU CMC

Igor Sokolov (Russian: И́горь Анато́льевич Соколо́в) (born 1954) is a Russian scientist, Dr. Sc., Professor, Academician of the Russian Academy of Sciences professor at the MSU CMC and Moscow Technological University (MIREA), director of the Institute for Informatics Problems. Acting Dean of the Faculty of Computational Mathematics and Cybernetics at Moscow State University (MSU CMC).

== Biography ==
He graduated from the faculty MSU CMC (1976).

He defended the thesis «Basics of construction of large-scale telecommunication systems of dual application» for the degree of Doctor of Technical Sciences (1998).

Was awarded the title of Corresponding Member of the Russian Academy of Sciences (2003), Academician of the Russian Academy of Sciences (2008).

Author of 3 books and more than 30 scientific articles.

Area of scientific interests: information technology, modeling of information flows in financial applications, development of applied mathematical methods, methods of monitoring communication networks.
