= Alexander Ilyin =

Alexander Ilyin may refer to:

- Aleksandr Aleksandrovich Ilyin (born 1983), Russian actor, poet, singer and songwriter
- Alexander Adolfovich Ilyin (born 1952), Soviet and Russian actor.
- Alexander Ilyin (mathematician) (born 1973), Russian mathematician
