= Sergei Mukhin =

Russian mathematician (born 1959)

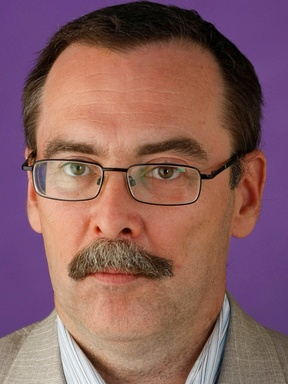
- Born: 22 September 1959 (age 66); Moscow
- Education: Moscow State University (1981)
- Scientific career
- Fields: Mathematics
- Workplaces: MSU CMC
- Doctoral advisor: Yuri Popov

Sergei Mukhin (Russian: Серге́й Ива́нович Му́хин) (born 1959) is a Russian mathematician, Professor, Dr.Sc., and a professor at the Faculty of Computer Science at the Moscow State University.

He graduated from the faculty MSU CMC in 1981. Mukhin has worked at Moscow State University since 1984. In 2009, he defended his thesis "Mathematical modeling of hemodynamics" for the degree of Doctor of Physical and Mathematical Sciences. He has authored 3 books and more than 80 scientific articles.

== Bibliography ==
- Evgeny Grigoriev (2010). Faculty of Computational Mathematics and Cybernetics: History and Modernity: A Biographical Directory (1 500 экз ed.). Moscow: Publishing house of Moscow University. pp. 114–115. ISBN 978-5-211-05838-5.
