= Alexander Vasin =

Russian mathematician (born 1952)

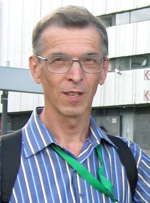
- Born: 8 August 1952 (age 74); Moscow
- Education: Moscow State University (1974)
- Scientific career
- Fields: Mathematics
- Workplaces: MSU CMC
- Doctoral advisor: Yuri Hermeyer

Alexander Vasin (Russian: Алекса́ндр Алексе́евич Ва́син) (born 1952) is a Russian mathematician, Professor, Dr.Sc., a professor at the Faculty of Computer Science at the Moscow State University. Specialist in the field of the theory of non-cooperative games and its applications to economics and biology.

He defended the thesis "Evolutionary models and principles of optimality of collective behavior" for the degree of Doctor of Physical and Mathematical Sciences (1991). Was awarded the title of Professor (1994).

Author of 6 books and more than 50 scientific articles.

== Literature ==
- Evgeny Grigoriev (2010). Faculty of Computational Mathematics and Cybernetics: History and Modernity: A Biographical Directory (1 500 экз ed.). Moscow: Publishing house of Moscow University. pp. 340–341. ISBN 978-5-211-05838-5.
