= Andrey Voronenko =

Russian mathematician (born 1972)

- Born: 13 January 1972 (age 54); Moscow, Russia
- Education: Moscow State University (1994)
- Scientific career
- Fields: Mathematics
- Workplaces: MSU CMC
- Doctoral advisor: Valery Alekseev

Andrey Voronenko (Russian: Андре́й Анато́льевич Вороне́нко) (born 1972) is a Russian mathematician, Professor, Dr.Sc., a professor at the Faculty of Computer Science at the Moscow State University.

He defended the thesis «Methods for representing discrete functions in problems of calculating, testing and recognizing properties» for the degree of Doctor of Physical and Mathematical Sciences (2008).

Was awarded the title of Professor (2009).

Author of 16 books and more than 80 scientific articles.

== Literature ==
- Evgeny Grigoriev (2010). Faculty of Computational Mathematics and Cybernetics: History and Modernity: A Biographical Directory (1 500 экз ed.). Moscow: Publishing house of Moscow University. pp. 375–376. ISBN 978-5-211-05838-5.
