= Nikolai Kapustin (mathematician) =

Russian mathematician (born 1957)

- Born: 3 October 1957 (age 68); Orekhovo-Zuyevo
- Education: Moscow State University (1979)
- Scientific career
- Fields: Mathematics
- Workplaces: MSU CMC
- Doctoral advisor: Vladimir Ilyin

Nikolai Yurievich Kapustin (Russian: Никола́й Ю́рьевич Капу́стин; born 3 October 1957) is a Russian mathematician, Professor, Dr. Sc., a professor at the Faculty of Computer Science at the Moscow State University.

He defended the thesis "Problems for parabolic-hyperbolic equations and corresponding spectral questions with a parameter at boundary points" for the degree of Doctor of Physical and Mathematical Sciences in 2012 and is the author of three books and more than 90 scientific articles.

== Bibliography ==
- Evgeny Grigoriev (2010). Faculty of Computational Mathematics and Cybernetics: History and Modernity: A Biographical Directory (1 500 экз ed.). Moscow: Publishing house of Moscow University. pp. 191–192. ISBN 978-5-211-05838-5.
