= BESM =

Series of Soviet mainframe computers built in 1950–60s

BESM (БЭСМ) is the series of Soviet mainframe computers built in 1950–60s. The name is an acronym for "Bolshaya (or Bystrodeystvuyushchaya) Elektronno-schotnaya Mashina" ("Большая электронно-счётная машина" or "Быстродействующая электронно-счётная машина"), meaning "Big Electronic Computing Machine" or "High-Speed Electronic Computing Machine". It was designed at the Institute of Precision Mechanics and Computer Engineering

== Models ==
The BESM series included six models.

=== BESM-1 ===
BESM-1, originally referred to as simply the BESM or BESM AN ("BESM Akademii Nauk", BESM of the Academy of Sciences), was completed in 1952. Only one BESM-1 machine was built. The machine used approximately 5,000 vacuum tubes. At the time of completion, it was the fastest computer in Europe. The floating-point numbers were represented as 39-bit words: 32 bits for the mantissa, one bit for sign, and six bits for the exponent (one bit for the sign of the exponent and five bits for its value). It was capable of representing numbers in the range 10^{−9} – 10^{10}. BESM-1 had 1024 words of read–write memory using ferrite cores, and 1024 words of read-only memory based on semiconducting diodes. It also had external storage: four magnetic tape units of 30,000 words each, and fast magnetic drum storage with a capacity of 5120 words and an access rate of 800 words/second. The computer was capable of performing 8–10 K Flops. The energy consumption was approximately 30 kW, not accounting for the cooling systems.

=== BESM-2 ===
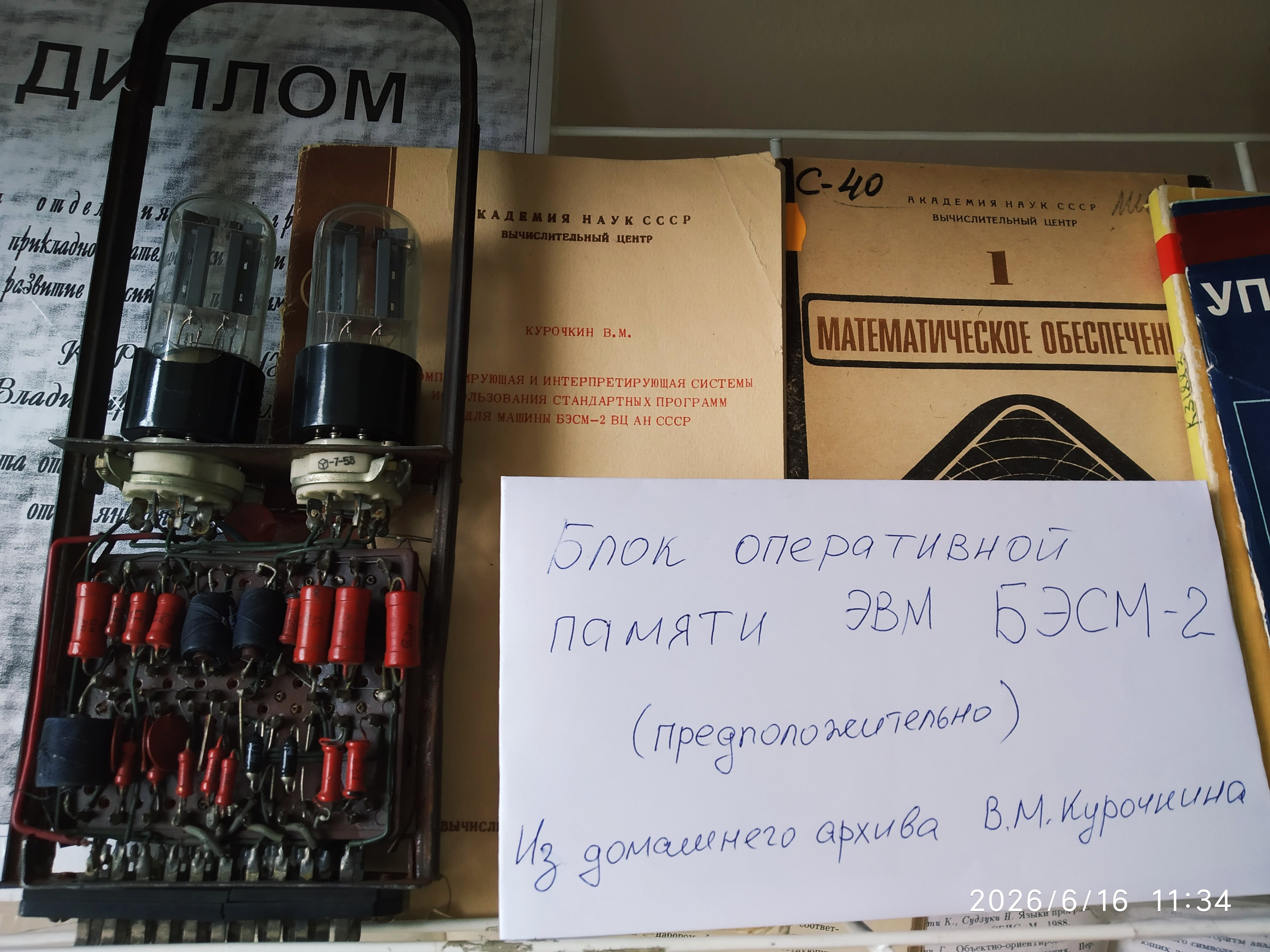
Presumably, the BESM-2 RAM block. Dorodnitsyn Computing Centre

BESM-2 also used vacuum tubes.

=== BESM-3M and BESM-4 ===
BESM-3M and BESM-4 were built using transistors. Their architecture was similar to that of the M-20 and M-220 series. The word size was 45 bits. Thirty BESM-4 machines were built. BESM-4 was used to create the first ever computer animation. The prototypes of both models were made in 1962–63, and the beginning of the series release was in 1964.

EPSILON (a macro language with high-level features including strings and lists, developed by Andrey Ershov at Novosibirsk in 1967) was used to implement ALGOL 68 on the M-220.

=== BESM-6 ===
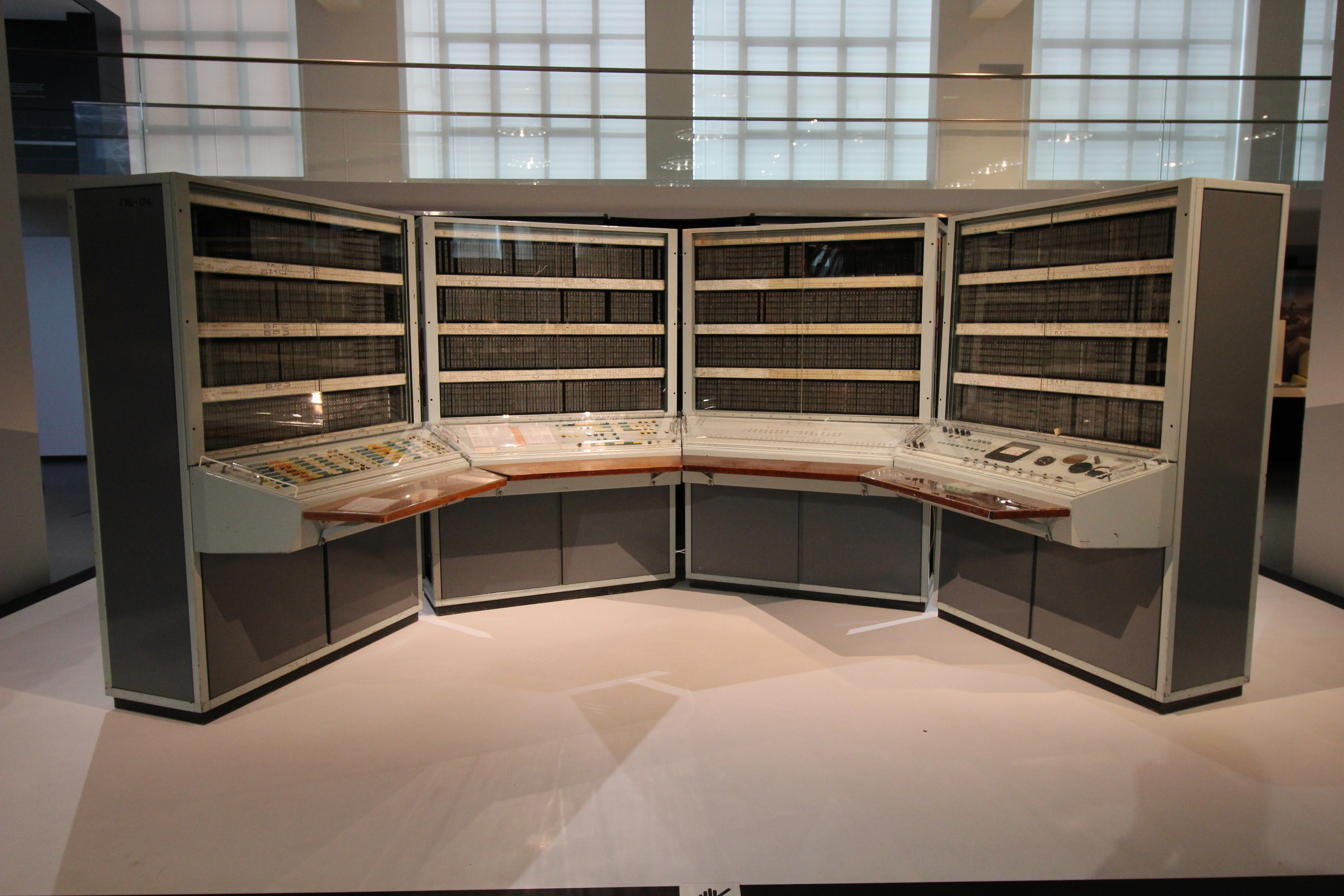
BESM-6 at London Science Museum

The BESM-6 was the best-known and most influential model of the series. The design was completed in 1965. Production started in 1968 and continued for the following 19 years.

== See also ==
- Sergei Alekseyevich Lebedev
- Lev Korolyov
- List of Soviet computer systems
- History of computing hardware
- History of computing in the Soviet Union
- List of vacuum tube computers
