= Igor Mashechkin =

Russian mathematician

- Игорь Машечкин
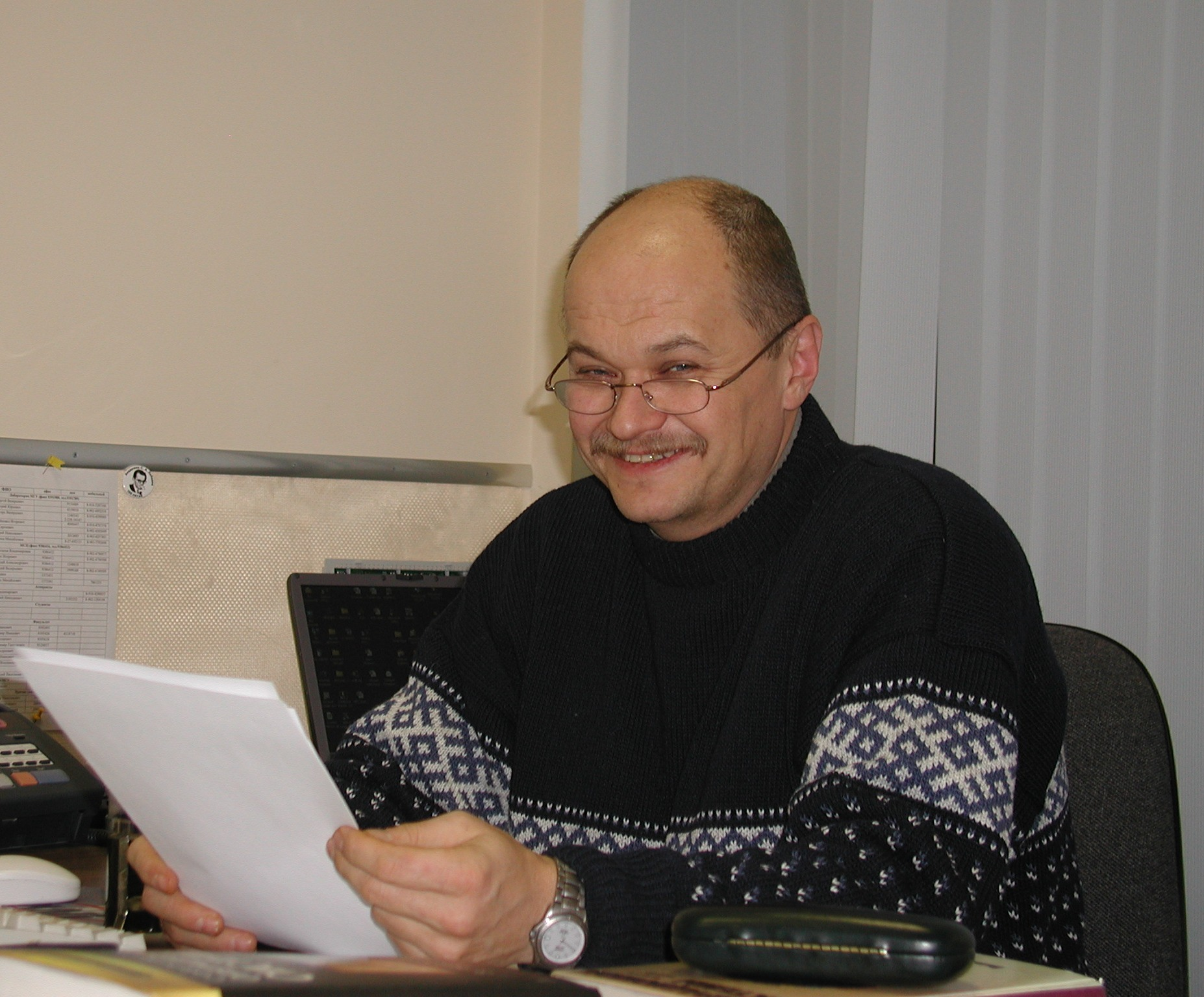
- Mashechkin at the faculty of MSU CMC, 2002
- Born: 11 April 1956 (age 70); Moscow, Russian SFSR, Soviet Union
- Education: Moscow State University (1978)
- Scientific career
- Fields: Mathematics
- Workplaces: MSU CMC
- Doctoral advisor: Lev Korolyov

Igor Valeryevich Mashechkin (Russian: Игорь Валерьевич Машечкин; born 11 April 1956) is a Russian mathematician, Professor, Dr.Sc., a professor at the Faculty of Computer Science at the Moscow State University.

He defended the thesis "Multifunctional cross-programming system" for the degree of Doctor of Physical and Mathematical Sciences (1996).

Author of 8 books and more than 100 scientific articles.

== Bibliography ==
- Evgeny Grigoriev (2010). Faculty of Computational Mathematics and Cybernetics: History and Modernity: A Biographical Directory (1 500 экз ed.). Moscow: Publishing house of Moscow University. pp. 440–442. ISBN 978-5-211-05838-5.
