= Nikolai Ardelyan =

Russian mathematician

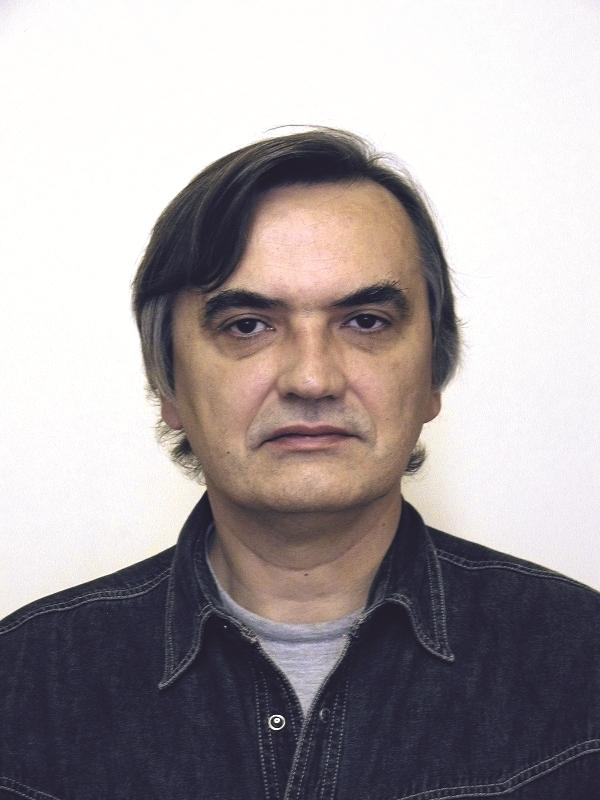
- Born: 18 September 1953 (age 72); Drohobych
- Education: Moscow State University
- Scientific career
- Fields: Mathematics
- Workplaces: MSU CMC
- Thesis: Difference-Operational Diagrams of the Dynamics of a Magnetic Gas (1992)
- Doctoral advisor: Yuri Popov

Nikolai Vasilievich Ardelyan (Russian: Никола́й Васи́льевич Арделя́н; born 18 September 1953) is a Russian mathematician, Professor, Dr.Sc., Honored Scientist of the Moscow State University, Leading Researcher of the MSU Faculty of Computational Mathematics and Cybernetics.

He defended the thesis «Difference-Operational Diagrams of the Dynamics of a Magnetic Gas» by the degree of Doctor of Physical and Mathematical Sciences (1992).

Author of 4 books and more than 160 scientific articles.

Honored Research Fellow of Moscow State University (2003).

== Literature ==
- Faculty of Computational Mathematics and Cybernetics: History and Modernity: A Biographical Directory (1 500 экз ed.). Moscow: Publishing house of Moscow University. 2010. pp. 149–150. ISBN 978-5-211-05838-5 – via Author-compiler Evgeny Grigoriev.
