= Alexey Izmailov =

Russian mathematician (born 1967)

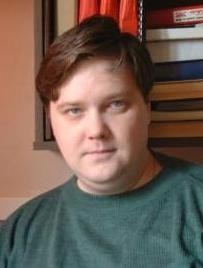
- Born: 30 September 1967 (age 58); Moscow, Russia
- Education: Moscow State University (1991)
- Scientific career
- Fields: Mathematics
- Workplaces: MSU CMC

Alexey Feridovich Izmailov (Russian: Алексе́й Фери́дович Измаи́лов) (born 1967) is a Russian mathematician who is a professor at the Faculty of Computer Science at the Moscow State University.

He defended the thesis Stable methods of finding special solutions of non-linear problems for the degree of Doctor of Physical and Mathematical Sciences in 1998.

He has authored 12 books and more than 150 scientific articles.

== Bibliography ==
- Grigoriev, Evgeny (2010). Faculty of Computational Mathematics and Cybernetics: History and Modernity: A Biographical Directory (1 500 экз ed.). Moscow: Publishing house of Moscow University. pp. 343–344. ISBN 978-5-211-05838-5.
