= Alexander Ilyin (mathematician) =

Russian mathematician, (born 1973)

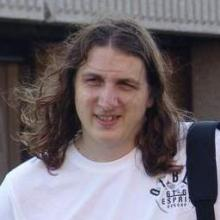
- Born: 11 January 1973 (age 53); Moscow, Russia
- Education: Moscow State University (1994)
- Scientific career
- Fields: Mathematics
- Workplaces: MSU CMC
- Doctoral advisor: Sergey Korovin

Alexander Ilyin (Russian: Алекса́ндр Влади́мирович Ильи́н, (born January 11, 1973) is a Russian mathematician, Professor, Dr. Sc., a professor at the Faculty of Computer Science at the Moscow State University, Corresponding Member of the Russian Academy of Sciences. Expert in robust control theory.

He defended the thesis «Robust inversion of dynamic systems» for the degree of Doctor of Physical and Mathematical Sciences (2009).

He has authored four books and more than 90 scientific articles.

He is the son of famed mathematician Vladimir Ilyin.

== Bibliography ==
- Evgeny Grigoriev (2010). Faculty of Computational Mathematics and Cybernetics: History and Modernity: A Biographical Directory (1 500 экз ed.). Moscow: Publishing house of Moscow University. pp. 258–259. ISBN 978-5-211-05838-5.
