= Dmitry Sychugov =

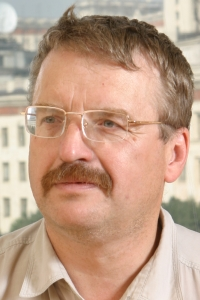
- Born: 18 September 1955 (age 70); Moscow
- Education: Moscow State University (1977)
- Scientific career
- Fields: Mathematics
- Workplaces: MSU CMC
- Doctoral advisor: Alexander Popov

Dmitry Sychugov (Russian: Дми́трий Ю́рьевич Сычу́гов) (born 1955) is a Russian mathematician, Dr.Sc., Professor, a professor at the Faculty of Computer Science at the Moscow State University.

He graduated from the faculty MSU CMC (1976). Has been working at Moscow State University since 1980.

He defended the thesis «Mathematical modeling of plasma confinement processes in toroidal traps» for the degree of Doctor of Physical and Mathematical Sciences (2013).

He is the author of five books and more than 80 scientific articles.

Area of scientific interests: mathematical modeling, computational physics of plasma.

== Bibliography ==
- Grigoriev, Evgeny (2010). Faculty of Computational Mathematics and Cybernetics: History and Modernity: A Biographical Directory. Moscow: Publishing house of Moscow University. pp. 205–206. ISBN 978-5-211-05838-5.
