= Sergey Solovyov (mathematician) =

Russian mathematician (1955–2023)

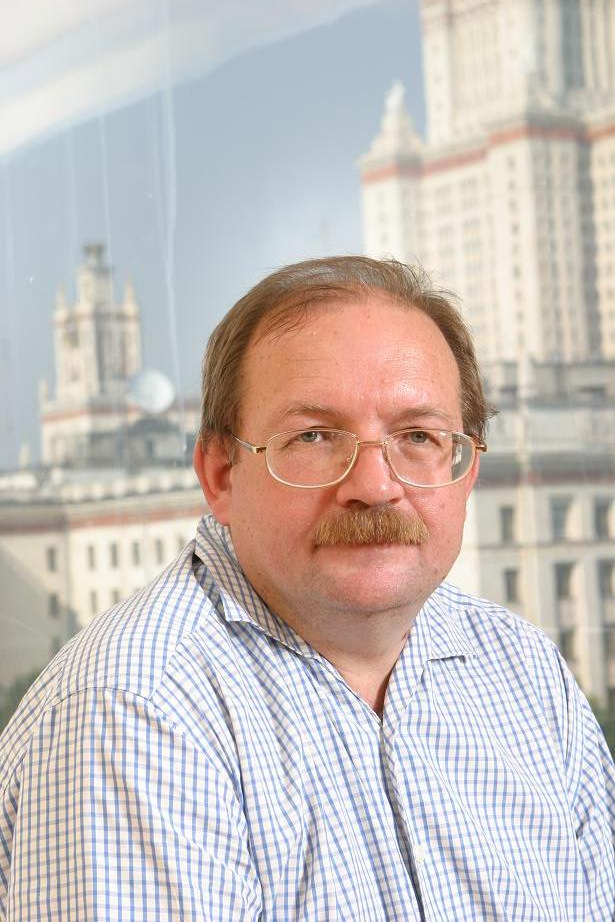
- Born: Sergey Yurievich Solovyov; 3 February 1955; Kiev, Ukrainian SSR, USSR
- Died: 22 September 2023 (aged 68)
- Education: Doctor of Science (1996); Professor (2003)
- Alma mater: Moscow State University (1977)
- Scientific career
- Fields: Mathematics
- Workplaces: MSU CMC
- Thesis: Mathematical methods and principles of building automated knowledge engineering systems (1996)
- Doctoral advisor: Trifonov, Nikolay Pavlovich|Nikolay Trifonov; Mikhail Malkovsky

Sergey Yurievich Solovyov (Russian: Серге́й Ю́рьевич Соловьёв; 3 February 1955 – 22 September 2023) was a Russian mathematician who was a professor at the Faculty of Computer Science at the Moscow State University.

== Life and career ==
Solovyov graduated from the faculty MSU CMC (1977).

Solovyov defended the thesis "Mathematical methods and principles of building automated knowledge engineering systems" for the degree of Doctor of Physical and Mathematical Sciences (1996).

Solovyov was awarded the title of Professor (2003).

His area of scientific interests was information systems. He was a Project Manager for Glossary. He wrote more than 70 scientific works on formal grammars, expert systems, experimental data processing systems and network technologies.

Sergey Solovyov died on 22 September 2023, at the age of 68.

== Literature ==
- Grigoriev, Evgeny, ed. (2010). Faculty of Computational Mathematics and Cybernetics: History and Modernity: A Biographical Directory. Moscow: Publishing house of Moscow University. pp. 413–414. ISBN 978-5-211-05838-5.
