= Vladimir Bening =

Russian mathematician

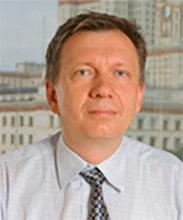
- Born: 29 June 1954 (age 72); Kostiantynivka
- Education: Moscow State University (1976)
- Scientific career
- Fields: Mathematics
- Workplaces: MSU CMC

Vladimir Bening (Russian: Влади́мир Евге́ньевич Бе́нинг) (born 1954) is a Russian mathematician, Professor, Dr.Sc., a professor at the Faculty of Computer Science at the Moscow State University.

He defended the thesis «Asymptotic analysis of distributions of some asymptotically efficient statistics in problems of hypothesis testing» for the degree of Doctor of Physical and Mathematical Sciences (1998).

Was awarded the title of Professor (2005).

Author of 16 books and more than 100 scientific articles.

== Literature ==
- Faculty of Computational Mathematics and Cybernetics: History and Modernity: A Biographical Directory (1 500 экз ed.). Moscow: Publishing house of Moscow University. 2010. pp. 296–297. ISBN 978-5-211-05838-5 – via Author-compiler Evgeny Grigoriev.
