= Alexander Razgulin =

Russian mathematician (born 1963)

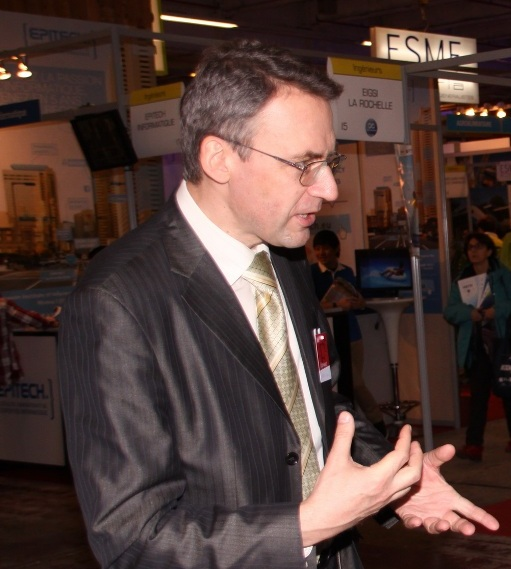
- Born: 19 January 1963 (age 63); Moscow, Russia
- Education: Moscow State University (1985)
- Scientific career
- Fields: Mathematics
- Workplaces: MSU CMC
- Doctoral advisor: Fyodor Vasiliev

Alexander Razgulin (Russian: Алекса́ндр Вита́льевич Разгу́лин) (born 1963) is a Russian mathematician, Professor, Dr.Sc., a professor at the Faculty of Computer Science at the Moscow State University.

He defended the thesis «Stable method for solving linear equations with noncompact operators and its applications to control and observation problems» for the degree of Doctor of Physical and Mathematical Sciences (2009).

Author of 24 books and more than 100 scientific articles.

== Bibliography ==
- Grigoriev, Evgeny (2010). Faculty of Computational Mathematics and Cybernetics: History and Modernity: A Biographical Directory. Moscow: Publishing house of Moscow University. pp. 50–51. ISBN 978-5-211-05838-5.
