= Evgeny Moiseev =

Russian mathematician and academician (1948–2022)

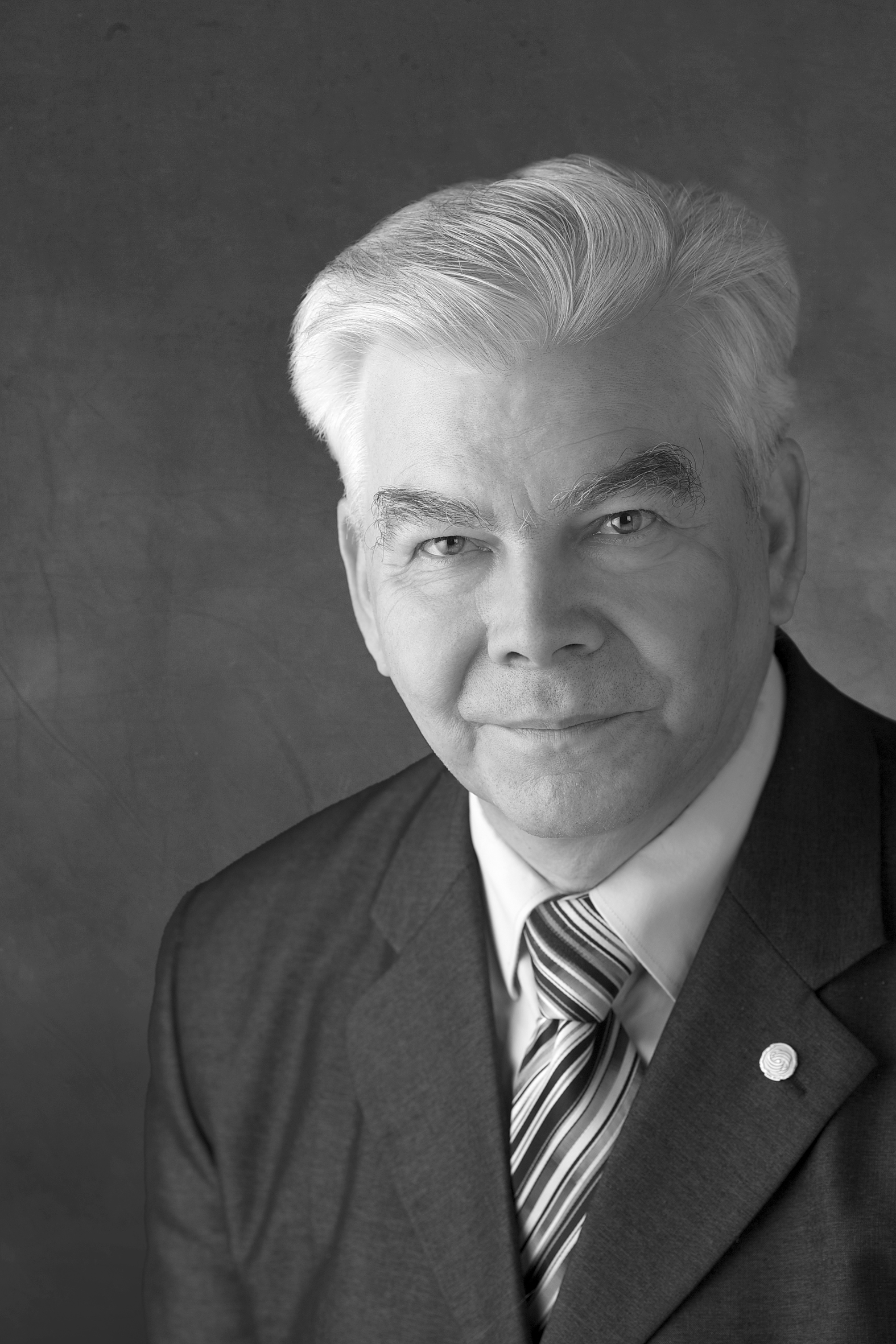
- Born: 7 March 1948; Odintsovo, Moscow Oblast, Russian SFSR, USSR
- Died: 25 December 2022 (aged 74); Moscow, Russia
- Citizenship: Soviet, Russian
- Education: Full Member RAS (2003)
- Alma mater: Moscow State University (1971)
- Awards: Lenin Komsomol Prize (1980) Order of Friendship (2005)
- Scientific career
- Fields: Mathematical physics
- Workplaces: MSU CMC
- Doctoral advisor: Vladimir Ilyin

Evgeny Moiseev (Russian: Евге́ний Моисе́ев, IPA: [evgeˈnij moiˈsejev]; 7 March 1948 – 25 December 2022) was a Russian mathematician, academician of the Russian Academy of Sciences, Dean of the Faculty of Computational Mathematics and Cybernetics at Moscow State University (MSU CMC), Head of the Department of Functional Analysis and its Applications at MSU CMC, Professor, Dr.Sc.

== Biography ==
Evgeny Moiseev was born in Odintsovo, Moscow region on 7 March 1948, and attended a school with specialized training in programming in Reutov. In 1965, after graduating from high school, he entered Moscow State University, the Faculty of Physics. After graduating from the Faculty of Physics in 1971, he became a postgraduate student at the MSU Faculty of Computational Mathematics and Cybernetics and received his Candidate of Sciences (PhD) degree in Physics and Mathematics in 1974 for a thesis entitled «On the uniqueness of solutions of the second boundary value problem for an elliptic equation».

Moiseev worked at the Faculty of Computational Mathematics and Cybernetics from 1974. He was an assistant (1974-1979), an assistant professor (1979-1983), a professor at the Department of General Mathematics (1983-2008). He was awarded a degree of Doctor of Science in Physics and Mathematics for his doctoral thesis «Some problems of mixed type equations spectral theory» in 1981. In 1999 Evgeny Moiseev was appointed Dean of the Faculty of Computational Mathematics and Cybernetics. Since 2008 he has been a professor and the Head of the Department of Functional Analysis and its Applications. He has also worked part-time at the Computational center of the Russian Academy of Sciences, most recently in the position of Chief Researcher.

In Moscow State University Evgeny Moiseev delivered the following lecture courses: Functional Analysis, Mathematical Analysis, Applied Functional Analysis, Mixed Equations, Singular Integral Equations, and Spectral Methods for Non-Classical Mathematical Physics Problems Solution. He also conducted special seminars.

Moiseev supervised 7 Doctors of Science and 15 PhDs in Mathematics and Physics.

Moiseev headed MSU Young Researchers Council for five years (1983–1988). He worked as Academic Secretary of CMC Council. He was a Deputy Chairman of the Expert Council of the Higher Attestation Commission, the Editor in Chief of the journal “Integral Transforms and Special Functions”, the Editor in Chief of the series “Computational Mathematics and Cybernetics” in “MSU Vestnik”, an editorial board member of the journals “Differential Equations” and “RFBR Vestnik”.

Moiseev died on 25 December 2022, at the age of 74.

== Research career ==
Moiseev`s research spans areas including computer science, mathematical modeling, spectral theory, and differential equations.

He has found the sectors on the complex plane which encompass the Tricomi problem spectrum for mixed equations in the gas dynamics theory. The solution of the Tricomi, Frankl and Gellersterdt problem has been efficiently presented in the form of biorthogonal series for both two-dimensional and three-dimensional cases. He has also researched the basis property of relevant root systems.

Moiseev has developed different methods for solving boundary value problems with non-local boundary conditions arising in turbulent plasma theory. He has solved the problem of determining the Riemann space-time coordinates functional dependence on the Mincowski space coordinates.

He has obtained the representation of forced oscillations in a coaxial layered waveguide in the form of finite sums of normal and adjoined waves and has proved the approximation possibility with such sums. In the theory of hyperbolic problems with boundary control Moiseev has solved the ZH-L Lions problem of a priori estimation of function gradient, Over the past years Evgeny Moiseev (in collaboration with Vladimir Il'in) has published a great number of works on optimal boundary control of string's oscillations with shift or elastic force.

== Awards and honours ==
Evgeny Moiseev has been awarded top national and international honours and prizes:

Full Member of the International Higher Education Academy of Sciences (1994)

Corresponding Member of the Russian Academy of Sciences (1997)

Honorary Professor at Moscow State University (2001)

Honorary Professor at Eurasian University (2001)

Academician of the Russian Academy of Sciences (2003)

Honorary Doctor at Eurasian University (Astana, Kazakhstan, 2004)

Lenin Komsomol Prize in science and technology (1980)

MSU Lomonosov Prize (1994)

Medal "In Commemoration of the 850th Anniversary of Moscow" (1997)

Order of Friendship (2005)

== Main scientific publications ==
Published more than 140 research papers and 17 monographs.
