= Fedor Zaytsev =

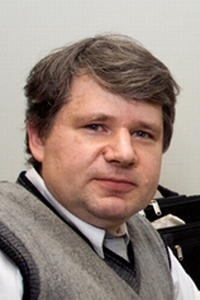
- Born: 19 May 1963 (age 63); Moscow
- Education: Moscow State University (1985)
- Scientific career
- Fields: Mathematics
- Workplaces: MSU CMC
- Doctoral advisor: Dmitry Kostomarov

Fedor Zaytsev (Russian: Фёдор Серге́евич За́йцев) (born 1963) is a Russian mathematician, Professor, Dr.Sc., a professor at the Faculty of Computer Science at the Moscow State University.

He defended the thesis «Mathematical modeling of kinetic processes with Coulomb interaction in toroidal plasma» for the degree of Doctor of Physical and Mathematical Sciences (1997).

Author of 7 books and more than 150 scientific articles.

== Bibliography ==
- Grigoriev, Evgeny (2010). Faculty of Computational Mathematics and Cybernetics: History and Modernity: A Biographical Directory. Moscow: Publishing house of Moscow University. pp. 197–198. ISBN 978-5-211-05838-5.
