= Andrei Krylov (mathematician) =

Russian mathematician (born 1956)

- Андре́й Крыло́в
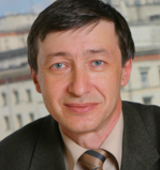
- Born: 6 October 1956 (age 69); Moscow
- Education: Moscow State University (1978)
- Scientific career
- Fields: Mathematics
- Workplaces: MSU CMC
- Doctoral advisor: Andrey Tikhonov

Andrei Sergeyevich Krylov (Russian: Андре́й Се́рджевич Крыло́в) (born 1956) is a Russian mathematician, specialist in mathematical methods of image processing, and Professor, Dr. Sc., a professor at the Faculty of Computer Science at the Moscow State University.

He defended his thesis Mathematical modeling and computer analysis of liquid metal systems for his degree for Doctor of Physical and Mathematical Sciences (2009).

He is the author of three books and more than 140 scientific articles.

== Bibliography ==
- Evgeny Grigoriev (2010). Faculty of Computational Mathematics and Cybernetics: History and Modernity: A Biographical Directory (1 500 экз ed.). Moscow: Publishing house of Moscow University. pp. 56–57. ISBN 978-5-211-05838-5.
