= Sergey Shorgin =

Russian mathematician

Sergey Yakovlevich Shorgin
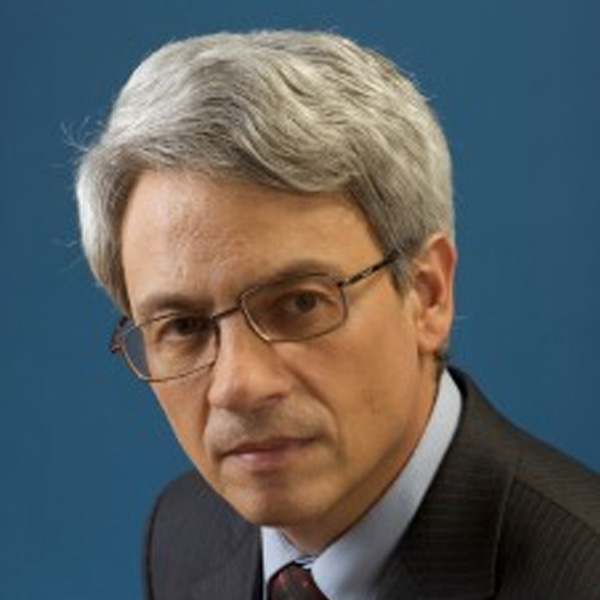
- Sergey Shorgin (2017)
- Born: November 11, 1952 (age 73); Kropyvnytskyi
- Education: Doctor of Science (1997); Professor (2003)
- Alma mater: Moscow State University (1974)
- Scientific career
- Fields: Mathematics
- Workplaces: Institute of Informatics Problems RAS
- Thesis: Definition of insurance tariffs: Stochastic models and estimation methods

Sergey Shorgin (Russian: Серге́й Я́ковлевич Шорги́н) (born 1952) is a Russian mathematician, Dr.Sc., Professor, a scientist in the field of informatics, a poet, a translator of poetry.

== Biography ==
He graduated from the faculty MSU CMC (1974). He defended his thesis for the degree of candidate of physical and mathematical sciences (1979). He defended his thesis «Defining Insurance Tariffs: Stochastic Models and Methods of Evaluation» for the degree of Doctor of Physical and Mathematical Sciences (1979). Was awarded the title of professor (2003). Published more than 100 scientific papers, including articles in leading scientific journals.

Deputy Director of Institute of Informatics Problems RAS.

Since 1999 she has been translating foreign poetry into Russian and writing her own poems. Among his translated poems are works of classics and contemporary authors of English, Scottish, American (USA), Australian, Canadian, Polish, Ukrainian, Belarusian, Slovak, German literature.
