= Svetlana Selezneva =

Russian mathematician

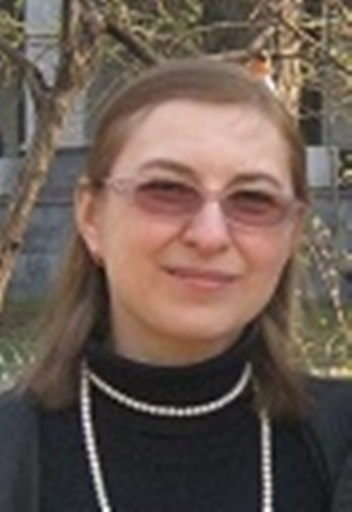
- Born: 9 September 1969 (age 56); Korosten
- Education: Moscow State University (1991)
- Scientific career
- Fields: Mathematics
- Workplaces: MSU CMC
- Doctoral advisor: Sergey Yablonsky, Valery Alekseev

Svetlana Selezneva (Russian: Светла́на Никола́евна Селезнёва) (born 1969) is a Russian mathematician, Dr.Sc., Associate professor, a professor at the Faculty of Computer Science at the Moscow State University.

She defended the thesis «Polynomial representations of discrete functions» for the degree of Doctor of Physical and Mathematical Sciences (2016).

She is the author of three books and more than 70 scientific articles.

== Bibliography ==
- Evgeny Grigoriev (2010). Faculty of Computational Mathematics and Cybernetics: History and Modernity: A Biographical Directory (1 500 экз ed.). Moscow: Publishing house of Moscow University. pp. 386–387. ISBN 978-5-211-05838-5.
