= IEEE Transactions on Learning Technologies =

- Discipline: Educational Technology
- Language: English
- Edited by: Minjuan Wang

Publication details
- History: 2008–present
- Publisher: IEEE Education Society
- Frequency: Bi-monthly
- Impact factor: 3.72 (2020)

Standard abbreviations
- ISO 4: IEEE Trans. Learn. Technol.

Indexing
- ISSN: 1939-1382
- OCLC no.: 1197686704

Links
- Journal homepage; Online access

The IEEE Transactions on Learning Technologies (TLT) is a peer-reviewed scientific journal covering advances in the development of technologies for supporting human learning. It was established in 2008 and is published by the IEEE Education Society. The current editor-in-chief (since 2022) is Minjuan Wang of San Diego State University. Formerly, the journal was edited by Mark J.W. Lee of the Charles Sturt University (2019-2022), Wolfgang Nejdl of the University of Hannover (2008–2012), and by Peter Brusilovsky of the University of Pittsburgh (2013–2018).

TLT was published on a quarterly basis until the end of 2020, after which it switched to a bi-monthly publication frequency. As per its statement of scope, the journal covers all advances in learning technologies and their applications, including but not limited to the following topics: innovative online learning systems; intelligent tutoring systems; educational games; simulation systems for education and training; collaborative learning tools; learning with mobile devices; wearable devices and interfaces for learning; personalized and adaptive learning systems; tools for formative and summative assessment; tools for learning analytics and educational data mining; ontologies for learning systems; standards and web services that support learning; authoring tools for learning materials; computer support for peer tutoring; learning via computer-mediated inquiry, field, and lab work; social learning techniques; social networks and infrastructures for learning and knowledge sharing; and creation and management of learning objects.

According to the Journal Citation Reports, TLT has a 2021 impact factor of 4.433 (Web of Science, 2022) and a 5-year impact factor of 4.255. It is one of only two educational technology journals that is included in both the Science Citation Index Expanded and the Social Sciences Citation Index, the other being Computers & Education (published by Elsevier). Its 2022 Scopus CiteScore is 7.5 (https://www.scopus.com/sourceid/19700167026), giving it a rank of #25 out of 1,319 journals in the "Education" category. TLT is also ranked among the top 20 journals in educational technology in Google Scholar.
