= Dmitry Kostomarov =

Russian mathematician

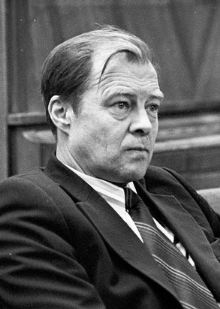
- Born: Dmitry Pavlovich Kostomarov; 23 March 1929; Moscow, RSFSR, Soviet Union
- Died: 9 August 2014 (aged 85); Moscow, Russia
- Education: Moscow State University (1952)
- Scientific career
- Fields: Electrodynamics, mathematical model

Dmitry Pavlovich Kostomarov (Russian: Дмитрий Павлович Костомаров; 23 March 1929 – 9 August 2014) was a Soviet and Russian mathematician, academician of the Russian Academy of Sciences, dean of the Faculty of Computational Mathematics and Cybernetics at Moscow State University (1990—1999), Professor, Dr.Sc.

== Biography ==
Born into the family of an engineer, a representative of the noble family of the Kostomarovs.

In 1947 he entered the Faculty of Engineering and Physics of the Moscow Mechanical Institute. In 1948 he transferred to the Faculty of Physics of Moscow State University, which he graduated with honors in 1952.

From 1952 to 1955 he studied in the graduate school of the Faculty of Physics at the Department of Mathematics, where the scientific leaders were Yury Rabinovich and Alexander Samarskii. In 1956 he defended his thesis for the degree of Candidate of Physical and Mathematical Sciences, the thesis entitled «On the asymptotic behavior of solutions of systems of linear differential equations in the neighborhood of an irregular singular point».

From 1955 he taught at the Moscow State University, assistant professor of mathematics at the Faculty of Physics (1955-1961), assistant professor (1961—1971). Since 1971 — at the faculty of the Faculty of the CMC of Moscow State University, associate professor of the department of computational mathematics (1971—1972). Doctor of Physical and Mathematical Sciences (1968), thesis: «Electromagnetic Waves in Plasma», since 1972 — Professor of the Faculty of the Faculty of the CMC, Head of the Department of Automation of Scientific Research of the Faculty of the CMC (since 1988). Dean of the Faculty of Computational Mathematics and Cybernetics (1990—1999).

== Scientific interests ==
Fundamental results in the field of mathematical modeling in plasma physics, electrodynamics, nuclear physics.

== Main scientific publications ==
He is the author of 10 monographs and more than 137 research papers.

== Awards and honours ==
- Lomonosov Prize of Moscow State University for achievements in the field of science (1976)
- Honored Worker of Science and Technology of the RSFSR (1980)
- USSR State Prize (1981)
- Order of the Red Banner of Labour (1990)
- Lomonosov Prize of Moscow State University for pedagogical activity (1996)
- Order of Honour (1999)
- Order of Friendship (2005)

== Bibliography ==
- Grigoriev, Evgeny (2010). Faculty of Computational Mathematics and Cybernetics: History and Modernity: A Biographical Directory. Moscow: Publishing house of Moscow University. pp. 194–195. ISBN 978-5-211-05838-5.
