= Sergey Lozhkin =

Russian mathematician (born 1951)

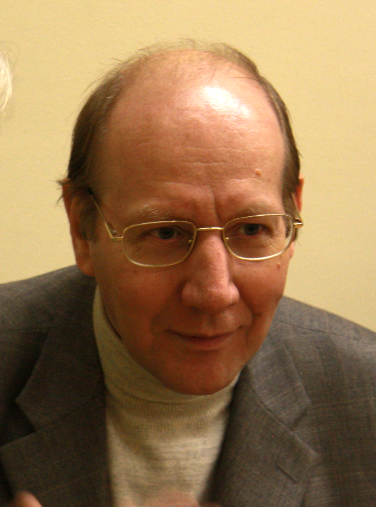
- Born: 29 March 1951 (age 75); Kirov
- Education: Moscow State University (1973)
- Scientific career
- Fields: Mathematics
- Workplaces: MSU CMC
- Doctoral advisor: Oleg Lupanov

Sergey Lozhkin (Russian: Ло́жкин Серге́й Андре́евич; born March 29, 1951) is a Russian mathematician, Professor, Dr.Sc., a professor at the Faculty of Computer Science at the Moscow State University.

He defended the thesis «Asymptotic estimates of a high degree of accuracy for the complexity of control systems» for the degree of Doctor of Physical and Mathematical Sciences (1998).

Author of 8 books and more than 80 scientific articles.

== Bibliography ==
- Evgeny Grigoriev (2010). Faculty of Computational Mathematics and Cybernetics: History and Modernity: A Biographical Directory (1 500 экз ed.). Moscow: Publishing house of Moscow University. pp. 376–377. ISBN 978-5-211-05838-5.
