= Peter Brusilovsky =

American computer scientist

- Born: Moscow
- Citizenship: USA
- Education: Moscow State University (1983)
- Scientific career
- Fields: Information science, computer science
- Workplaces: University of Pittsburgh, Carnegie Mellon University, University of Trier, University of Sussex
- Doctoral advisor: Lev Korolyov

Peter Brusilovsky is a professor of information science and intelligent systems at the University of Pittsburgh. He is known as one of the pioneers of adaptive hypermedia, adaptive web design, and web-based adaptive learning. He has published numerous articles in user modeling, personalization, educational technology, intelligent tutoring systems, and information access. As of February 2015 Brusilovsky was ranked as #1 in the world in the area of computer education and #21 in the world in the area of World Wide Web by Microsoft Academic Search. According to Google Scholar as of April 2018, he has over 33,000 citations and h-index of 77. Brusilovsky's group has been awarded best paper awards at Adaptive Hypermedia, User Modeling, Hypertext, IUI, ICALT, and EC-TEL conference series, including five James Chen Best Student paper awards.

Brusilovsky studied applied mathematics and computer science at the Moscow State University. His doctoral advisor was Lev Nikolayevich Korolyov. He received postdoctoral training at University of Sussex, University of Trier, and Carnegie Mellon University under the guidance of Ben du Boulay, Gerhard Weber, and John Anderson. This research was supported by fellowships from Royal Society, Alexander von Humboldt Foundation, and James S. McDonnell Foundation. Since 2000 he worked as an assistant professor, associate professor, and full professor at the University of Pittsburgh School of Computing and Information (formerly School of Information Sciences). He also served as founding associate editor-in-chief (2007–2012) and editor-in-chief (2013–2018) of IEEE Transactions on Learning Technologies. Brusilovsky is a recipient of NSF CAREER Award, SFI ETS Walton Visitor Award, and Fulbright-Nokia Distinguished Chair in Information and Communications Technologies. He also holds an honoris causa degree from Slovak University of Technology in Bratislava.

Brusilovsky coined the term "explorable explanation" for media that uses interactive models to communicate scientific ideas.
