= Viktor Korolev (mathematician) =

Russian scientist in the field of mathematical statistics

- Born: 27 December 1954 (age 71); Moscow
- Education: Moscow State University (1977)
- Scientific career
- Fields: Mathematics
- Workplaces: MSU CMC

Viktor Korolev (Russian: Ви́ктор Юрьевич Королёв) (born 1954) is a Russian scientist in the field of mathematical statistics, Professor, Dr. Sc., a professor at the Faculty of Computer Science at the Moscow State University.

He defended the thesis «Limit distributions of random sequences with independent random indices and some of their applications» for the degree of Doctor of Physical and Mathematical Sciences (1994).

He has authored 27 books and more than 340 scientific articles.

== Bibliography ==
- Evgeny Grigoriev (2010). Faculty of Computational Mathematics and Cybernetics: History and Modernity: A Biographical Directory (1 500 экз ed.). Moscow: Publishing house of Moscow University. pp. 314–315. ISBN 978-5-211-05838-5.
