= Vladimir Zakharov (mathematician) =

Russian Mathematician

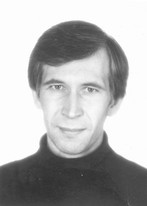
- Born: 29 May 1960 (age 66); Kharkiv
- Education: Moscow State University (1982)
- Scientific career
- Fields: Mathematics
- Workplaces: MSU CMC
- Doctoral advisor: Sergey Yablonsky

Vladimir Zakharov (Russian: Влади́мир Анато́льевич Заха́ров) (born 1960) is a Russian mathematician, Professor, Dr.Sc., a professor at the Faculty of Computer Science at the Moscow State University.

He defended the thesis «The problem of program equivalence: models, algorithms, complexity» for the degree of Doctor of Physical and Mathematical Sciences (2012).

Author of 2 books and more than 70 scientific articles.

== Bibliography ==
- Grigoriev, Evgeny (2010). Faculty of Computational Mathematics and Cybernetics: History and Modernity: A Biographical Directory. Moscow: Publishing house of Moscow University. pp. 382–383. ISBN 978-5-211-05838-5.
