= Innovative University of Eurasia =

Coordinates: 52°15′48.8″N 76°57′34.7″E

Innovative University of Eurasia (Pavlodar, Kazakhstan) is a multi-discipline university in Kazakhstan, offering 57 programs in Engineering, Economics, Law, Natural Sciences, and Humanities.

== Museums and galleries ==
There is a museum of Kazakh culture and university history, and an Art gallery of InEU students' and teachers' works.

== Mass-media ==
The scientific journal Vestnik of InEU is published at the university.

== Buildings and parks ==
InEU campus consisting of five educational buildings, a library complex, computer classes with Internet access, a publishing center, sports halls and sites, a student's cafe, and a hostel. There are parks and squares at the InEU area.
