= Mikhail Potapov (mathematician) =

Russian mathematician

- Born: 12 April 1953 (age 73); Balashikha
- Education: Moscow State University (1975)
- Scientific career
- Fields: Mathematics
- Workplaces: MSU CMC
- Doctoral advisor: Yuri Popov

Mikhail Potapov (Russian: Михаи́л Миха́йлович Пота́пов) (born 1953) is a Russian mathematician, Professor, Dr.Sc., a professor at the Faculty of Computer Science at the Moscow State University.

He defended the thesis «Stable method for solving linear equations with noncompact operators and its applications to control and observation problems» for the degree of Doctor of Physical and Mathematical Sciences (2009).

Author of 15 books and more than 50 scientific articles.

== Bibliography ==
- Evgeny Grigoriev (2010). Faculty of Computational Mathematics and Cybernetics: History and Modernity: A Biographical Directory (1 500 экз ed.). Moscow: Publishing house of Moscow University. pp. 280–281. ISBN 978-5-211-05838-5.
