= M series (computer) =

Former range of Russian general-purpose computers

M-20, M-220 and M222 were a range of general-purpose computers designed and manufactured in the USSR. These computers were developed by the Scientific Research Institute of Electronic Machines and built at Moscow Plant of Calculating and Analyzing Machines (SAM) and the Kazan Plant of Computing Machines (under the Ministry of Radio Industry of the USSR).

== Operating systems ==
The operating system provided batch processing and simultaneous execution, subsequently enhanced to provide a multitasking mode.

- OS4-220 – for the М-220
- DM-222 – for the М-222

== Available programming languages ==
- FORTRAN – an optimized ALPHA translator – by A.P. Ershov
- ALGOL 60 – compiler
- ALGOL 68 – compiler, written in ALGOL 60
