= Vladimir Ilyin (mathematician) =

Soviet and Russian mathematician

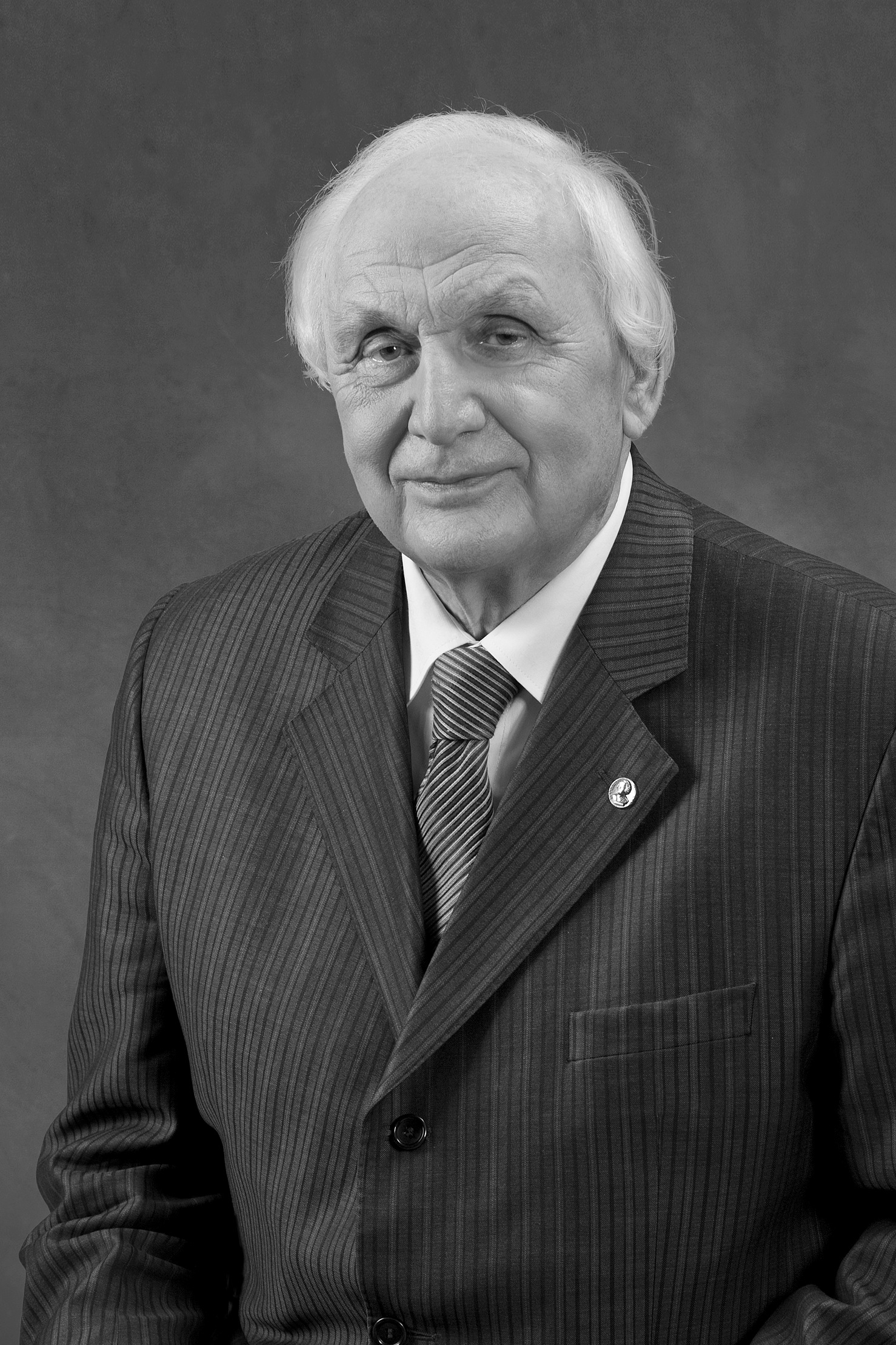
- Born: Vladimir Aleksandrovich Ilyin; 2 May 1928; Kozelsk, Kaluga Governorate, Soviet Union
- Died: 26 June 2014 (aged 86); Moscow, Russia
- Education: Moscow State University (1950)
- Awards
- Scientific career
- Fields: Mathematical physics
- Workplaces: MSU
- Doctoral advisor: Andrey Tikhonov
- Doctoral students: Evgeny Moiseev

Vladimir Aleksandrovich Ilyin (Russian: Влади́мир Алекса́ндрович Ильи́н; May 2, 1928 – June 26, 2014) was a Soviet and Russian mathematician, Professor at Moscow State University, Doctor of Science, Academician of the Russian Academy of Sciences who made significant contributions to the theory of differential equations, the spectral theory of differential operators, and mathematical modeling.

== Biography ==
Ilyin was allowed to skip the first grade and start school from the second grade in Moscow in 1936 and finished school with a gold medal in 1945. After graduating from the MSU Faculty of Physics in 1950 with Honours Ilyin continued education at the same faculty as a postgraduate student specializing in mathematical physics. In 1953 Ilyin obtained his Candidate of Science degree in Physics and Mathematics for the thesis «Diffraction of electromagnetic waves on some inhomogeneities», his scientific advisor being Andrey Tikhonov.

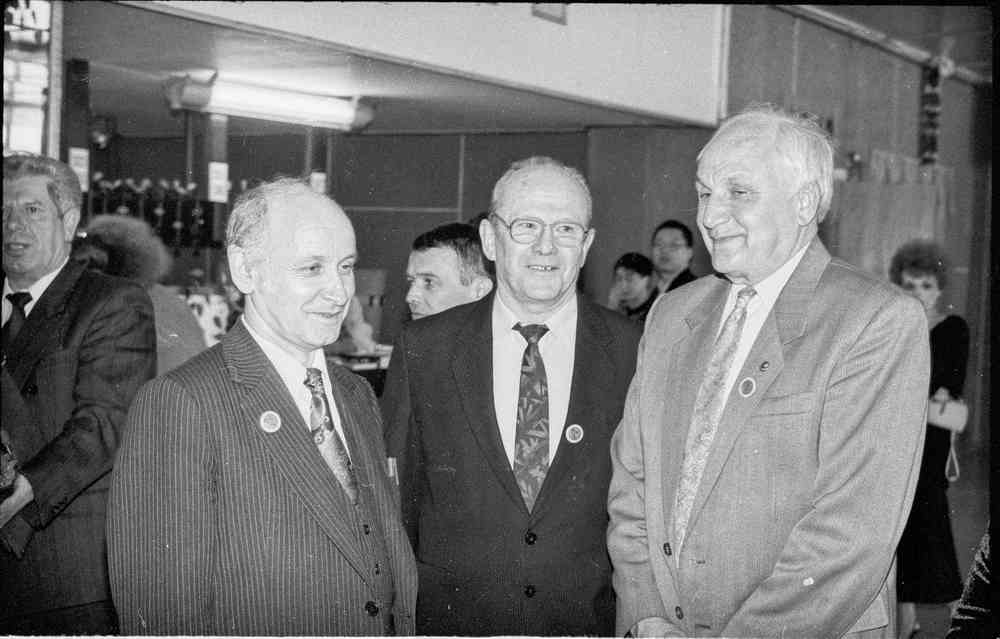
Professor Mikhail Dmitriyev, Professor Anatoly Tsirlin and Academician Vladimir Ilyin in the University of Pereslavl-Zalessky (1988).

In 1958 he obtained Doctor of Science degree in Physics and Mathematics for his thesis «On convergence of expansions in eigenfunctions of Laplace operator».

In 1960 he was appointed Professor of the Faculty of Physics at Moscow State University.

From 1953 till the end of his life Ilyin worked at Moscow State University:

- at the Department of Mathematics of the MSU Faculty of Physics as an Assistant (1953–1957), as an Associate Professor (1957–1959), as a Professor (1959–1970);
- at the Department of General Mathematics of the MSU Faculty of Computational Mathematics and Cybernetics as a Professor (1970–1974), and the Head of the Department (1974–2014).

Since 1973 he also worked as a Chief Researcher at Steklov Institute of Mathematics (Department of Theory of Functions).

- 1987 - Corresponding Member of the Academy of Sciences of the USSR
- 1990 - Academician of the Academy of Sciences of the USSR
- 1991 - Academician of the Academy of Sciences
- 1996 - Academician of the International Higher Education Academy of Sciences
- Since 1995 - Editor-in-Chief of monthly journal «Differential Equations» of the Russian Academy of Sciences
- Since 1998 - member of the editorial board and then Deputy Editor-in-Chief of the Russian Academy of Sciences journal «The Proceedings of the Russian Academy of Sciences»

Ilyin was the author of more than 140 research papers and 17 monographs on mathematical analysis, analytical geometry, and linear algebra, which were published both in Russia and abroad. He supervised 28 Doctors of Sciences and more than 100 Candidates of Sciences in Physics and Mathematics. For several years he chaired the Expert Council of the Higher Attestation Commission. He was the member of the State Prize Committee of the Russian Federation. He was also the member of Scientific and Methodological Council on Mathematics under the Ministry of Education of Russia.

His son, Aleksandr Ilyin, the Corresponding Member of the Russian Academy of Sciences, is a professor of the Department of Nonlinear Dynamic Systems and Control Processes at CMC MSU.

== Teaching activities ==
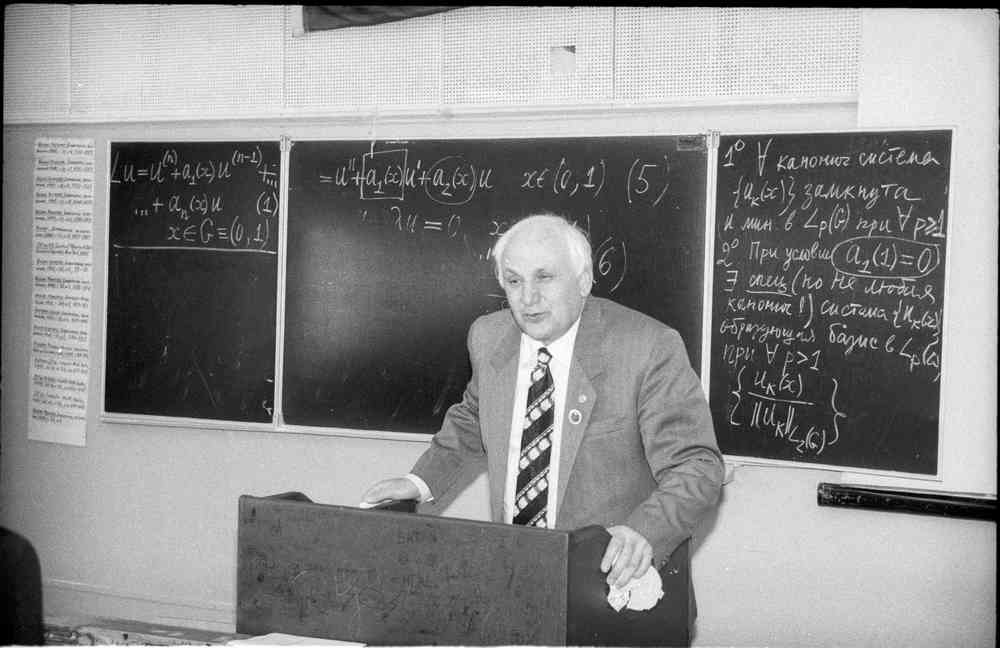
Vladimir Ilyin is making a report «Controlling the oscillations of a rod fixed at one end» at the university of Pereslavl-Zalessky (2008)

Ilyin's 55-year scientific and pedagogical activity is connected with Moscow State University: with the Faculty of Physics, where he started his career, and with the Faculty of Computational Mathematics and Cybernetics. He supervised 28 Doctors of Sciences and more than 100 Candidates of Science in Physics and Mathematics. Several of his students are Members of the Russian and National Academies of Sciences.

Ilyin is considered to have been a brilliant lecturer. He wrote a lot of textbooks, which have become classical. Eight of them have been included into the series «Classical University Textbook». The lecture courses he gave within his pedagogical activity included: «Equations of Mathematical Physics», «Equations of Elliptic Type», «Functional Analysis», «Mathematical Analysis», and «Linear Algebra and Analytical Geometry».

== Areas of Expertise ==
Ilyin is recognized for his scientific achievements in the theory of boundary value and mixed problems for equations of mathematical physics in domains with non-smooth boundaries and discontinuous coefficients. His results for hyperbolic equations (combined with earlier results obtained by Andrey Tikhonov, O.A. Oleinik, and G. Tautz for parabolic and elliptic equations) demonstrated that in terms of domain boundary conditions the solvability of all the three problems reduces to the solvability of a simplest problem of mathematical physics, the Dirichlet problem for the Laplace equation. In the late 1960s Ilyin developed a universal method that made it possible for an arbitrary selfadjoint second-order operator in an arbitrary (not necessarily bounded) domain to establish the final conditions of uniform (on any compact) convergence for both spectral expansions themselves and their Riesz means in each of the classes of functions (Nikolsky, Sobolev-Liouville, Besov and Sigmund-Holder function classes). These conditions also proved to be novel and final for expansions into both the multiple Fourier integral and the trigonometric Fourier series.

In 1971 Ilyin published a negative solution to the problem posed by Israel Gelfand concerning the validity of the theorem on equiconvergence of spectral expansion with the expansion into a Fourier integral for the case when the expansion itself has no uniform convergence.

In 1972 he published a negative solution to the problem posed by Sergei Sobolev on the convergence for $p \neq 2$ in the spectral expansion metric $p \neq 2$ of a finite function from this class. He developed a new method for estimating the remainder term of the spectral function of an elliptic operator in both the metric $L_{\infty}$ and the metric $L_2$.

Ilyin made a fundamental contribution to the spectral theory of nonself-adjoint operators. He obtained the conditions under which the system of eigenvectors and associated vectors for the one-dimensional boundary value problem has the basis property in $L_p$ for $p \geq 1$.

In 1980-1982 he obtained estimates for $L_2$-norms of eigenfunctions and associated functions using a one order higher associated function. He called these estimates «anti-a priori estimates». He also showed that these estimates are central to the theory of nonselfadjoint operators.

In a joint work with Evgeny Moiseev and K.V. Malkov in 1989, he demonstrated that the previously established conditions for the basis property of the system of eigenfunctions and associated functions of an operator $L$ are both necessary and sufficient existence conditions for a complete system of motion integrals of a nonlinear system generated $(L,A)$ by a Lax pair.

From 1999, and for the rest of his life Ilyin focused on boundary control problems for processes described by hyperbolic equations, specifically by the wave equation. For a number of cases, he obtained formulas describing optimal boundary controls (in terms of minimizing the boundary energy) that transfer the system from a given initial state to a given finite state (the results obtained in co-authorship with Evgeny Moiseev are among the best achievements of the Russian Academy of Sciences in 2007 year).

== Awards and honours ==
- USSR State Prize (1977, 1980)
- Order of the Red Banner of Labour (1980)
- M.V. Lomonosov MSU Award (1980) – for his scientific achievements
- Order of Friendship of Peoples (1988)
- Award of Ministry of Higher Education USSR «For the best scientific work» (1988)
- M.V. Lomonosov MSU Award (1992) – for his teaching activities
- Order of Honour (4 December 1998) for services to the state, long dedicated work, and major contribution to strengthening friendship and cooperation between nations
- MSU Professor Emeritus (1998)
- Honorary citizen of Kozelsk (1998)
- MSU Best lecturer (2000)
- Order "For Merit to the Fatherland" 4th class (15 January 2004) for outstanding contribution to the development of national science and training of highly qualified specialists
- Award of the President of the Russian Federation in the field of education for 2003 (25 January 2005)
- Order "For Merit to the Fatherland" 3rd class (21 February 2012) for contribution to the development of national science and education and training of highly qualified specialists
