= Yuri Prokhorov =

Russian mathematician (1929–2013)

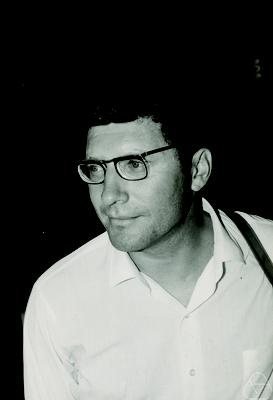
- Born: Yuri Vasilyevich Prokhorov; 15 December 1929; Moscow, Soviet Union
- Died: 16 July 2013 (aged 83); Moscow, Russia
- Citizenship: Soviet Union, Russian
- Education: Moscow State University
- Awards: Lenin Prize (1970); Order of the Red Banner of Labour (1975, 1979)
- Scientific career
- Fields: Probability theory
- Workplaces: Russian Academy of Sciences
- Doctoral advisor: Andrey Kolmogorov

Yuri Vasilyevich Prokhorov (Russian: Ю́рий Васи́льевич Про́хоров; 15 December 1929 – 16 July 2013) was a Soviet and Russian mathematician, active in the field of probability theory. He was a PhD student of Andrey Kolmogorov at the Moscow State University, where he obtained his PhD in 1956.

Prokhorov became a corresponding member of the Academy of Sciences of the Soviet Union in 1966, a full member in 1972. He was a vice-president of the IMU. He received Lenin Prize in 1970, Order of the Red Banner of Labour in 1975 and 1979. He was also an editor of the Great Soviet Encyclopedia.

== See also ==
- Lévy–Prokhorov metric
- Prokhorov's theorem
