= Yuri Zhuravlyov (mathematician) =

Russian mathematician (1935–2022)

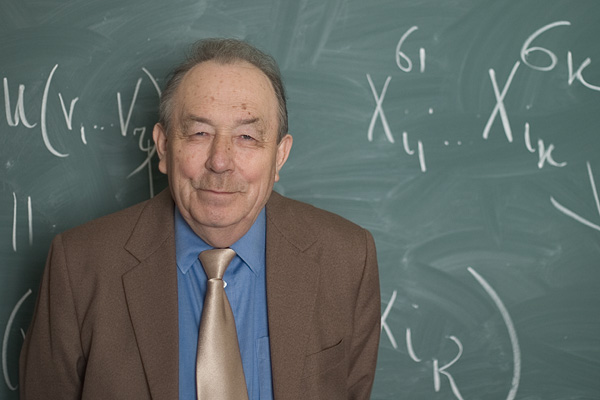
- Born: Yuri Ivanovich Zhuravlyov; 14 January 1935; Voronezh, RSFSR, Soviet Union
- Died: 14 January 2022 (aged 87); Moscow, Russia
- Education: Full Member RAS (1992)
- Alma mater: Moscow State University
- Scientific career
- Fields: Mathematics
- Workplaces: Dorodnitsyn Computing Centre, Moscow State University

Yuri Ivanovich Zhuravlyov (Russian: Юрий Иванович Журавлёв; 14 January 1935 – 14 January 2022) was a Soviet and Russian mathematician specializing in the algebraic theory of algorithms. His research in applied mathematics and computer science was foundational for a number of specialties within discrete mathematics, pattern recognition, and predictive analysis. Zhuravlyov was a full member of the Russian Academy of Sciences and the chairman of its "Applied Mathematics and Informatics" section. He was also the editor-in-chief of the international journal Pattern Recognition and Image Analysis.

== Biography ==
Zhuravlyov was born on 14 January 1935 in Voronezh in the former Soviet Union. In 1952, after finishing high school, he applied and was accepted into the Mathematics Department at Moscow State University. Under the direction of Alexey Lyapunov, he completed his first serious work on the minimization of partially defined boolean functions. The work was published in 1955 and awarded first prize at the All-Soviet student research competition.

In 1957, Zhuravlyov completed his master's thesis on a solution to the problem of finding words in a finite set with consideration for its construction. In 1959, he completed his doctoral work which involved a proof for lack of local unsolvability for constructing the minimal disjunctive normal form.

In 1959, he moved to Novosibirsk, where he pursued government-sponsored research and taught algebra and mathematical logic at the Novosibirsk University. In 1966, he began research into pattern recognition. His first serious work in this field related to the identification of deposits in the area of gold mining. He then developed a model of algorithms for calculating estimates that became foundational for numerous subsequent research and works in the field.

In 1969, Zhuravlyov moved to Moscow to head the Pattern Recognition Lab at the Central Soviet Computing Center. In 1970, he also joined the faculty of the Moscow Institute of Physics and Technology as a full professor.

Throughout the 1970s and 1980s, Zhuravlyov published a series of seminal works in applied mathematics and informatics. In 1991, he founded the journal Pattern Recognition and Image Analysis. In 1992, he was invited to join the Russian Academy of Sciences. In 1997, he became a professor at Moscow State University.

Zhuravlyov died in Moscow on 14 January 2022, on his 87th birthday.
