= Corresponding member =

Type of in-group membership ranking

The corresponding member is one of the possible membership types in some organizations, especially in the learned societies and scientific academies.

This title existed or exists in the Soviet Union, GDR, Polish People's Republic, Czechoslovak Socialist Republic, France, Ukraine, Belarus, Poland, Russia.

== Original category of membership ==
Historically, this kind of membership was usual for the individuals living far from the academy or outside the country where the central academy offices are located. Because such people were unable to attend meetings, for organizational reasons they had to communicate their scientific contributions by "correspondence". This is why the status name includes the word "corresponding".

The problem of accessibility is important also now and accounted for by some institutions in the world. So, for example, the Australian Academy of Science entitles the prominent foreign researchers only to corresponding membership; among the people with this status are David Attenborough (United Kingdom), Rolf M. Zinkernagel (Switzerland), Elizabeth Blackburn (US) and Gunnar Öquist (Sweden). In such situations, a corresponding membership has normally the same weight as a full membership.

== Modern category of membership ==
With a development of transportation services, the distance problem is gradually getting milder. As a result, the term "corresponding member" has changed its initial meaning. Presently, in the most of academies where a corresponding membership exists, this is, in fact, a membership of the lower level, as compared to the full members called academicians. For example, in the Academies of Science in some post-Soviet states (e.g., Russia, Belarus, Ukraine), following the custom of the Academy of Sciences of the USSR, a scientist is usually first elected to the corresponding membership and several years later, if the scientist demonstrates new outstanding achievements, to the full membership.

In some organizations, "corresponding" membership may be preferred by an applicant (which can be an individual or a legal entity) itself. In particular, the International Organization of Legal Metrology offers two options for the countries: "member" and "corresponding member", and the American Association of Physicists in Medicine also has the full and corresponding variants of membership for the specialists.
