= MSU Faculty of Mechanics and Mathematics =

Faculty of Moscow State University

- Механико-математический факультет МГУ
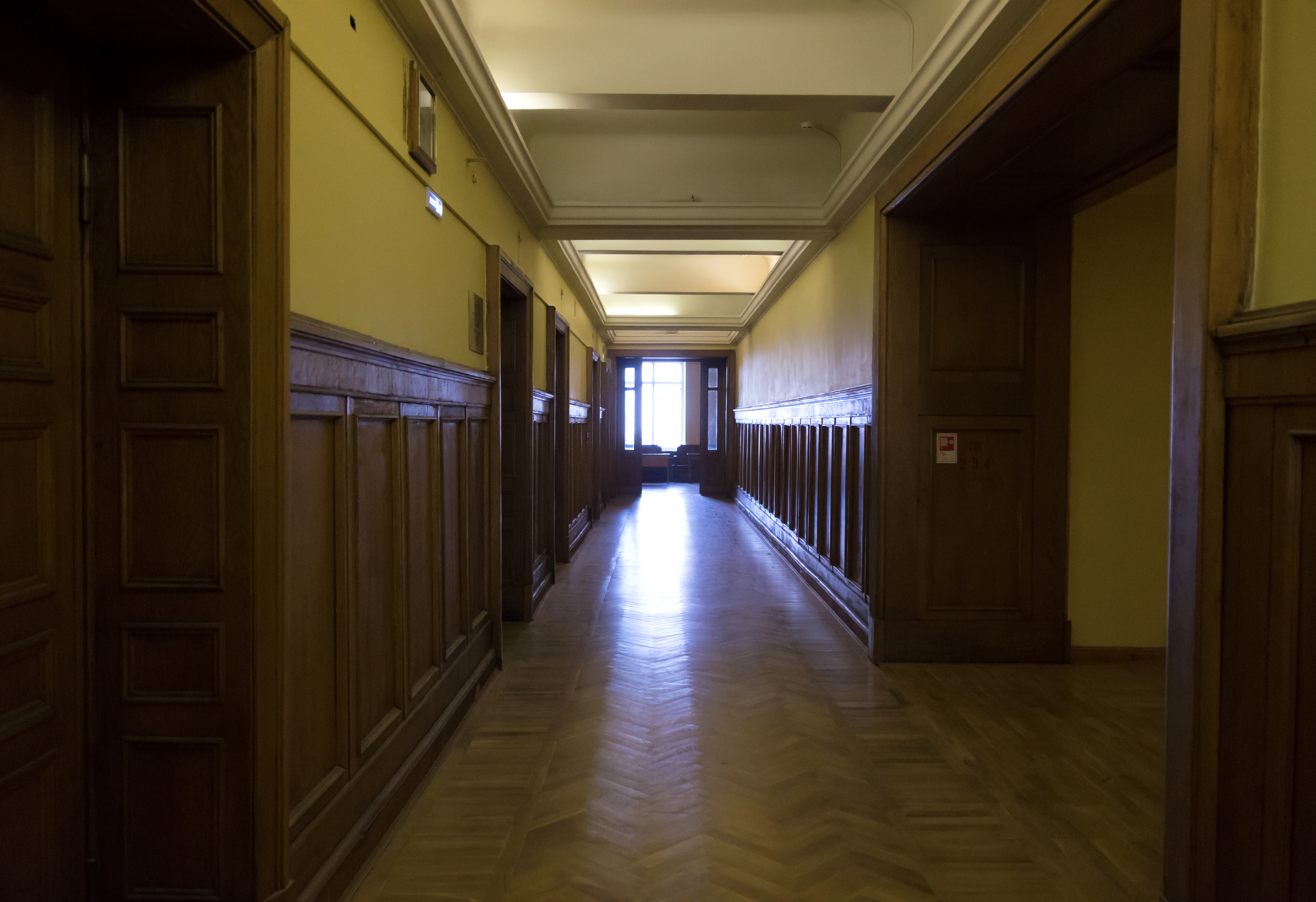
- Other name: Мехмат МГУ
- Established: 1933
- Dean: Andrei Shafarevich
- Location: Moscow, Russia; 55.7031°N 37.5306°E
- Website: Official website

The MSU Faculty of Mechanics and Mathematics (Russian: Механико-математический факультет МГУ) is a faculty of Moscow State University.

== History ==
Although lectures in mathematics had been delivered since Moscow State University was founded in 1755, the mathematical and physical department was founded only in 1804. The Mathematics and Mechanics Department was founded on 1 May 1933 and comprised mathematics, mechanics and astronomy departments (the latter passed to the Physics Department in 1956). In 1953 the department moved to a new building on the Sparrow Hills and the current division in mathematics and mechanics branches was settled. In 1970, the Department of Computational Mathematics and Cybernetics broke off the department due to the research in computer science.

A 2014 article entitled "Math as a tool of anti-semitism" in The Mathematics Enthusiast discussed antisemitism in the Moscow State University’s Department of Mathematics during the 1970s and 1980s.

=== Current state ===
Today the Department comprises 26 chairs (17 in the mathematical and 9 in the mechanics branch) and 14 research laboratories. Around 350 professors, assistant professors and researchers work at the department. Around 2000 students and 450 postgraduates study at the department. The education lasts 5 years (6 years from 2011).

== Notable alumni ==
- Pavel Alexandrov - mathematician
- Vladimir Arnold - mathematician
- Grigory Barenblatt - mathematician
- Felix Berezin - mathematician and physicist
- Joseph Bernstein - Israeli mathematician
- Fedor Bogomolov - mathematician
- Pafnuty Chebyshev - mathematician
- Boris Demidovich - mathematician
- Vladimir Drinfeld - Soviet-American mathematician; winner of the Fields Medal 1990
- Messoud Efendiev - mathematician
- Gregory Eskin - Russian-Israeli-American mathematician
- Dmitry Fuchs - Russian-American mathematician
- Israel Gelfand - Soviet-American mathematician
- Mikhail Gelfand - Russian bioinformaticist and molecular biologist
- Victor Ginzburg - Russian-American mathematician
- Gu Chaohao - Chinese mathematician
- Anatole Katok - American mathematician
- Mstislav Keldysh - mathematician; President of the USSR Academy of Sciences 1961–1975
- Tanya Khovanova - Soviet-American mathematician
- Faina Mihajlovna Kirillova - mathematician and control theorist
- Andrey Kolmogorov - mathematician
- Victor Kolyvagin - mathematician
- Maxim Kontsevich - mathematician; winner of the Fields Medal in 1998
- Boris Korenblum - Soviet-Israeli-American mathematician
- Grigory Landsberg - physicist
- Leonid Levin - Soviet-American mathematician and computer scientist
- Vladimir Levenshtein - mathematician
- Boris Levit - mathematician
- Nikolai Luzin - mathematician
- Grigory Margulis - Russian-American mathematician; winner of the Fields Medal 1978
- Sergei Novikov - mathematician; winner of the Fields Medal in 1970
- Andrei Okounkov - mathematician; winner of the Fields Medal in 2006
- Alexander Moiseevich Olevskii - Russian-Israeli mathematician
- Olga Oleinik - mathematician
- Ivan Petrovsky - mathematician
- Abraham Plessner - mathematician
- Leonid Polterovich - Russian-Israeli mathematician
- Vladimir Rokhlin - mathematician
- Inna Sergeyevna Shcherbina-Samoylova - astronomer and astrophysicist
- Yakov Sinai - Russian-American mathematician
- Ilya M. Sobol - mathematician
- Bella Subbotovskaya - mathematician
- Hoang Tuy - Vietnamese mathematician

== Notable faculty (past and present) ==
- Algebra – O. U. Schmidt, A. G. Kurosh, Yu. I. Manin
- Number theory – B. N. Delaunay, A. I. Khinchin, L. G. Shnirelman, A. O. Gelfond
- Topology – P. S. Alexandrov, A. N. Tychonoff, L. S. Pontryagin, Lev Tumarkin
- Real analysis – D. E. Menshov, A. I. Khinchin, N. K. Bari, A. N. Kolmogorov, S. B. Stechkin
- Complex analysis – I. I. Privalov, M. A. Lavrentiev, A. O. Gelfond, M. V. Keldysh
- Ordinary differential equations – V. V. Stepanov, V. V. Nemitski, V. I. Arnold, N. N. Nekhoroshev
- Partial differential equations – I. G. Petrovsky, S. L. Sobolev, E. M. Landis
- Mathematical logic and Theory of algorithms – A. A. Markov (Jr.), A. N. Kolmogorov, V. A. Melnikov, V. A. Uspensky, A. L.Semenov
- Calculus of variations – L. A. Lusternik
- Functional analysis – A. N. Kolmogorov, I. M. Gelfand
- Probability theory – A. I. Khinchin, A. N. Kolmogorov, Ya. G. Sinai, A. N. Shiryaev
- Differential geometry – V. F. Kagan, A. T. Fomenko, N. V. Efimov
- Discrete mathematics – O. B. Lupanov
- Theoretical Mechanics and Mechatronics – D. E. Okhotsimsky, V. V. Rumyantsev
- Aero- and hydrodynamics – L. I. Sedov
- Wave theory – A. I. Nekrasov
