= First International Topological Conference =

Mathematical conference in Moscow (1935)

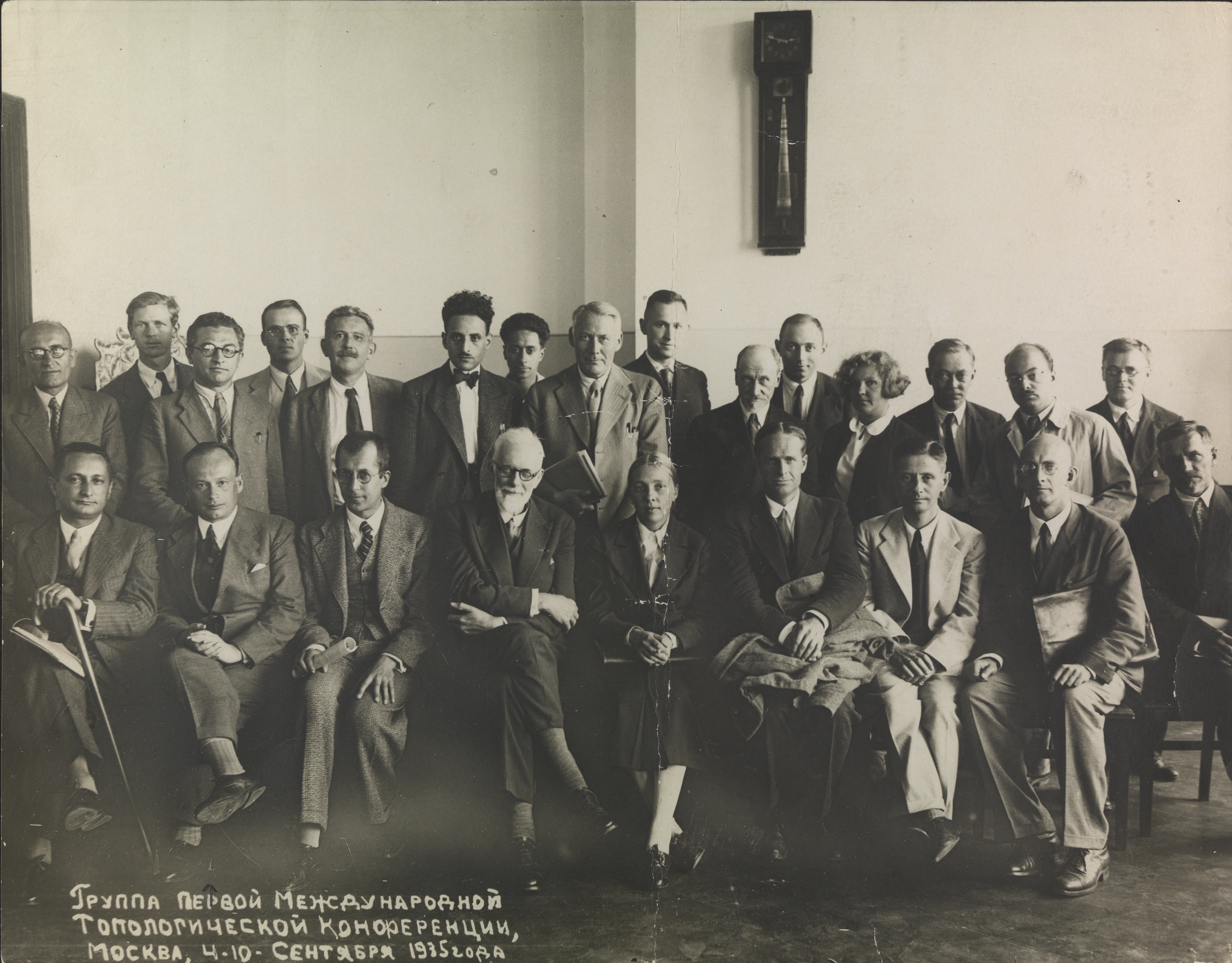
Attendees of the First International Topological Conference, Moscow, 4–10 September, 1935

The first International Topological Conference was held in Moscow, 4–10 September, 1935. With presentations by topologists from 10 different countries it constituted the first genuinely international meeting devoted to topology in the world history of the mathematical community. Although a previous mathematical conference had been held in Kharkiv, and attended by Jacques Hadamard, this turned out to be the only truly international conference organised under the Stalin regime. Pavel Aleksandrov played a key role in organising the conference. The foreign delegates were accommodated in major hotels across Moscow, although according to André Weil, the principal form of sustenance was Caviar Canapes served in the conference hall, as no food was available in the hotel restaurants.

== Presentations ==
Documentation of the conference varies, but this summary was drawn from various sources.

=== Homology theory ===
- Karol Borsuk: ‘‘On spheroidal spaces’’
- Eduard Čech: "Accessibility and Homology'"
- Israel Isaakovich Gordon: ‘‘On the intersection invariants of a complex and its residual space.’
- Solomon Lefschetz: ‘‘On locally connected sets.’’

== Attendees ==
The following topologists made presentations:

- Czechoslovakia:
  - Eduard Čech
- France:
  - André Weil
- Netherlands
  - Hans Freudenthal
  - Egbert van Kampen
- Poland:
  - Karol Borsuk
  - Kazimierz Kuratowski
  - Juliusz Schauder
  - Kazimierz Zarankiewicz
- United States:
  - James Waddell Alexander II
  - Garrett Birkhoff
  - Solomon Lefschetz
  - John von Neumann
  - Albert W. Tucker
  - Hassler Whitney
- USSR:
  - Pavel Aleksandrov
  - Felix Frankl
  - Israel Isaakovich Gordon
  - Maria A. Nikolaenko
  - Julia Rozanska
  - Lev Pontryagin
  - Vyacheslav Stepanov
  - Lev Tumarkin
