= Felix Frankl =

Austrian physicist (1905–1961)

Felix Issidorowitsch Frankl (12 March 1905, Vienna – 7 Aprile 1961, Nalchik Russian: Феликс Исидорович Франкль) was an Austrian mathematician, who went to live in the Soviet Union where he had an academic career as a university professor.

He studied topology at the Faculty of Mathematics of the University of Vienna under Hans Hahn, gaining his doctorate in 1927.

Frankl joined the Austrian Communist Party in 1928 and (with the assistance of Pavel Aleksandrov) emigrated to the Soviet Union in 1929. Here he initially collaborated with Lev Pontryagin in topology (they a paper co-authored a paper published in 1930 in the Mathematische Annalen. His interests then shifted to certain particular differential equations which are important for high-speed aerodynamics. These differential equations were of mixed elliptic-hyperbolic type. They determined the transition in aerodynamics between transonic and supersonic speeds.

He attended the First International Topological Conference held in Moscow in 1935. In 1957 he was awarded the Leonhard Euler Gold Medal of the Russian Academy of Sciences.

In 1950 he was expelled from the communist party and exiled to Bishkek. He died in 1961 in Nalchik.
