= Julia Rozanska =

Russian topologist

Iulia Antonivna Rozhanska (Ukrainian: Юлія Антонівна Рожанська; Russian: Юлия Антоновна Рожанская; 1901 – 23 April 1967), also spelt Julia Różańska, was a Soviet topologist. After studying under Pavel Aleksandrov, she was an associate professor at Moscow State University. She was a member of the Moscow Mathematical Society. She attended the First International Topological Conference, Moscow, 1935.

== Works ==
- Różańska, J. (1926). "Über stetige Kurven". Proceedings. Akadamie van Wetenschappen Amsterdam (in German). 29: 1251–1261. ISSN 0370-0348. OCLC 478742956.
- — V. V. Stepanov (1928). "Очерк развития топологии в СССР за 10 лет" [Sketch of the development of the topology in the USSR for a period of ten years]. Mat. Sb. (in Russian). 35 ((Number supplementary)): 43–61 – via www.mathnet.ru.
- — (1930). "Sur les décompositions continues de surfaces en des courbes cantoriennes". Comptes Rendus Hebdomadaires des Séances de l'Académie des Sciences (in French). 190: 1360–1362. ISSN 0001-4036. OCLC 1027223916. available at Gallica..
- — (1930). "Über stetige Zerlegungen von Flächen in zueinander fremde Kurven". Recueil Mathématique (in German). 37: 41–51.
- — (1931). "Elementare Beweise zweier Urysohnscher Kurvensätze". Recueil Mathématique (in Russian). 38 (1–2): 98–100.
- — (1937). "'Über stetige Abbildungen eines Elementes". Fundamenta Mathematicae. 28: 219–232. doi:10.4064/fm-28-1-219-232. ISSN 0016-2736.. The paper she presented at the Moscow Conference, 1935.
