= Fortov =

Fortov (Russian: Фортов, from форт meaning fortress) is a Slavic masculine surname, its feminine counterpart is Fortova. It may refer to:

- Iveta Zelingerová (née Fortová in 1972), Czech cross country skier
- Vladimir Fortov (1946–2020), Russian physicist

== See also ==
- 3813 Fortov, a minor planet
