= Boris Demidovich =

Soviet Belarusian mathematician (1906–1977)

- Барыс Паўлавіч Дземідовіч
- Born: 2 March 1906; Navahrudak, Minsk Governorate, Russian Empire (now Belarus)
- Died: 23 April 1977 (aged 71); Moscow, Russian SFSR, Soviet Union (now Russia)
- Known for: Problems in Mathematical Analysis
- Scientific career
- Fields: mathematics (calculus)
- Institutions: Moscow State University
- Doctoral advisor: Andrey Kolmogorov, Vyacheslav Stepanov, Viktor Vladimirovich Nemytskii

Boris Pavlovich Demidovich (Russian: Борис Павлович Демидович; Belarusian: Барыс Паўлавіч Дземідовіч, romanized: Barys Paulavich Dziemidovich; 2 March 1906 – 23 April 1977) was a Soviet Belarusian mathematician.

== Family and early life ==
Demidovich was born in a family of teachers. His father, Pavel (1871 – 1931), was able to get higher education, graduating in 1897 in Vilna; Pavel Demidovich was a teacher throughout his life, first teaching in different towns in the Minsk and Vilna Governorates, and then in Minsk; he was very attached to his family, and to Belarusian beliefs and rituals. He also recorded some anonymous literary works of the Belarusian tradition. In 1908 Pavel Demidovich was nominated member of the Imperial Officer of the Company Enthusiasts science, Anthropology at Moscow University.
Demidovich's mother, Olympia Platonovna Demidovich (1876–1970), the daughter of a priest, had been a teacher too before her marriage, when she chose to retire, in order to raise their children. Boris Demidovich had three sisters, Zinaida, Evgeniia, Zoya and a younger brother, Paul.

After graduating in 1923 Demidovich attended the physical-mathematical branch of the teaching faculty, that had been established in 1921, at the Belarusian State University. He obtained his degree in 1927 and was recommended to the graduate school faculty of higher mathematics, but Demidovich did not consider that a possibility and went to work in Russia instead.

== Professional life ==
For four years, Demidovich served as professor of mathematics in secondary schools throughout the Smolensk and Bryansk regions. After casually reading an advertisement in a local newspaper, he moved to Moscow and in 1931, taught in a graduate school of the Research Institute of Mathematics and Mechanics at Moscow State University. At the end of this short term, he obtained the teaching chair in the Transportation and Economic Institute NKPS, and taught there at the Department of Mathematics in 1932–33. In 1933, while retaining his teaching office at T.E.I. NKPS, Demidovich was even enlisted as senior member at the Bureau of Pilot Transport construction NKPS and worked there until 1934.
At the same time, in 1932, Demidovich became a post-graduate student at the Mathematical Institute, Moscow State University, after succeeding a competition. As a postgraduate, Demidovich began to work under the guidance of Andrey Nikolaevich Kolmogorov on the theory of functions of a real variable.

Kolmogorov saw that Demidovich was interested in the problems of differential equations, invited him to join him in studying the qualitative theory of ordinary differential equations under the direction of Vyacheslav Stepanov. Supervising his activities, Stepanov identified himself as the scientific advisor of his younger colleague.

After his graduation, in 1935, Demidovich worked for one semester at the Department of Mathematics at the Institute for the leather industry. And, since February 1936, at the invitation of LA Tumarkin, he served as assistant chair of mathematical analysis of Mechanics and Mathematics Faculty of Moscow State University. Until his death he remained a permanent staff member. In 1935 at the Moscow University, Demidovich discussed his PhD thesis, "On the existence of the integral invariant on a system of periodic orbits" and the following year, he was awarded the degree of Ph.D.

In 1938, Demidovich was granted the rank of assistant professor of mathematical analysis at Mehmat MSU. In 1963, VAK awarded him the degree of Doctor of physical and mathematical sciences, and in 1965, Demidovich was granted the rank of professor in the department of mathematical analysis at Mehmat MSU. In 1968, the Presidium of the Supreme Council of Russia awarded Demidovich the honorary title "Meritorious Scientist of the RSFSR".

Demidovich suddenly died on 23 April 1977 of acute cardiovascular insufficiency.

== Scientific and pedagogical activities ==
Demidovich mainly worked in five areas:

- dynamical systems with integral invariants;
- periodic and quasi-periodic solutions of ordinary differential equations;
- correct and it is correct (on Demidovich) differential system;
- limited solutions of ordinary differential equations;
- sustainability of ordinary differential equations, in particular, the orbital stability of dynamical systems.

Along with scientific and educational activities in the MSU, BP Demidovich concurrently taught at several leading universities in Moscow (MVTU, NE Bauman, the Military Engineering Academy, F. E. Dzerzhinsky, etc.). His experience as a teacher is reflected in the books he wrote on mathematical analysis, that were translated into many foreign languages. His mathematical analysis problem book (Сборник задач и упражнений по математическому анализу, English and Chinese translations available) was particularly influential and continues to be used in calculus education in the People's Republic of China. Demidovich was often invited in Organizing Committees of scientific conferences and he actively cooperated with the editorial staff of various mathematical journal ("Differential Equations", RJ "Mathematics"), as well as the mathematical formulation of "BSE".
