= Leonhard Euler Gold Medal =

The Leonhard Euler Gold Medal (Золотая медаль имени Леонарда Эйлера) is a medal named after the Swiss, German, and Russian mathematician Leonhard Euler, awarded by the Отделением математических наук (Branch of Mathematical Sciences of the Russian Academy of Sciences) for outstanding results in mathematics and physics. The medal was awarded once in 1957 to two scientists and since 1991 has been awarded every five years.

== Laureates ==
- 1957 — Igor Kurchatov and Felix Frankl for outstanding results in mathematics and physics
- 1991 — Aleksandr Danilovich Aleksandrov for fundamental contributions to the development of mathematics
- 1997 — Yury Osipov for outstanding results in mathematics and physics
- 2002 — Ludvig Faddeev for outstanding results in mathematics and physics
- 2007 — Valery Vasilevich Kozlov for a series of papers on nonlinear Hamiltonian systems of differential equations
- 2012 — Sergei Novikov for his deep contribution to the application of topological methods in quantum physics
- 2017 — Igor Shafarevich for outstanding contributions to number theory and algebraic geometry
- 2022 — Sergei Godunov for outstanding results in the field of computational mathematics
