= Vladimir Fortov =

Russian physicist and politician (1946–2020)

- Владимир Фортов
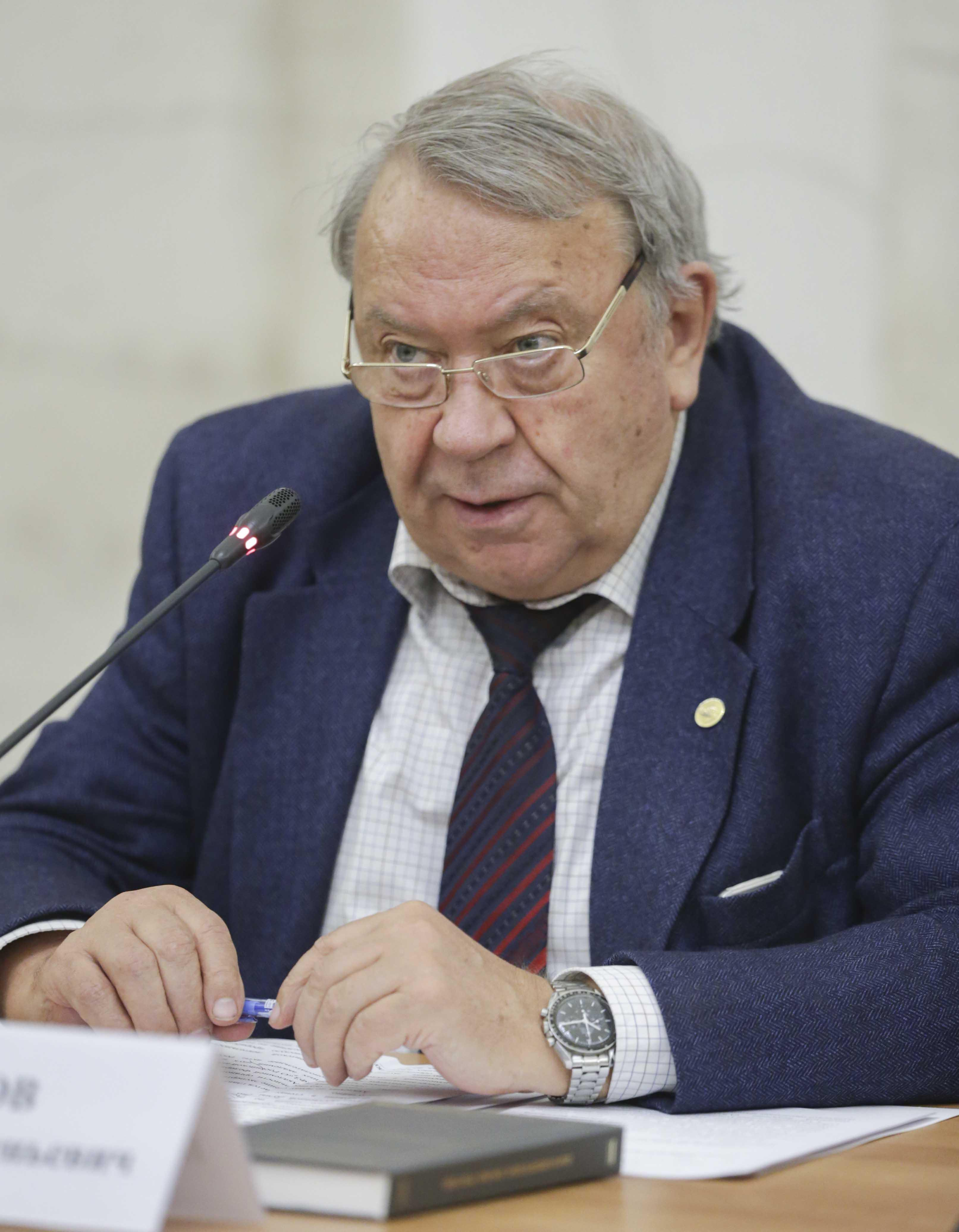
- Fortov in 2016

President of the Russian Academy of Sciences
- In office 29 May 2013 – 22 March 2017
- Preceded by: Yury Osipov
- Succeeded by: Valery Kozlov (acting), Alexander Sergeev

Deputy Chairman of the Government
- In office 17 August 1996 – 17 March 1997

Minister of Science and Technology of the Russian Federation
- In office 17 August 1996 – 25 July 1998
- Preceded by: Boris Saltykov
- Succeeded by: Vladimir Bulgak

Personal details
- Born: 23 January 1946 Noginsk, Russian SFSR, Soviet Union
- Died: 29 November 2020 (aged 74) Central Clinic and Hospital, Moscow, Russia
- Education: Moscow Institute of Physics and Technology
- Profession: Academic of Russian Academy of Sciences

Vladimir Yevgenyevich Fortov (Russian: Владимир Евгеньевич Фортов; 23 January 1946 – 29 November 2020) was a Russian physicist and politician who served as director of the Joint Institute for High Temperatures (1992–2013) and as president of the Russian Academy of Sciences (2013–2017). His research was in thermal physics, shock waves, plasma physics, and Black matter.

== Biography ==
Fortov studied physics at the Moscow Institute of Physics and Technology, graduating in 1968. In 1971, he received his Candidate of Sciences degree, and in 1976 the Doctor of Sciences degree. He was a professor at the same university from 1982. Between 1971 and 1986 Fortov was employed at the Institute of Chemical Physics in Chernogolovka, and between 1986 and 1992, still being a part-time researcher at the same institution, he was also employed by the Joint Institute for High Temperatures. In 1992, he was appointed the director of this institute.

From 1993 to 1997, Fortov was the chairman of the Russian Foundation for Basic Research, the governmental organization responsible for funding fundamental research. In 1996, he also became a chairman of the State Committee of Science and Technology, and later a minister of science and technology. The government he was a part of retired in 1998.

According to the law, the President of the Russian Academy of Sciences is formally appointed by the President of the Russian Federation. Vladimir Putin, who at the time was the president of Russia, only signed the appointment of Fortov on 8 July 2013. On 20 March 2017, elections for the president of the Academy were scheduled, and Fortov ran as one of the three candidates. Unexpectedly the previous day all candidates retracted their nominations, and the elections were canceled. On 22 March, Fortov resigned, citing health issues, and Valery Kozlov was appointed acting president.

Fortov's research was in the areas of thermal physics, shock waves, and plasma physics. He was involved with applications, in particular, to energy production.

Fortov died on 29 November 2020, in Moscow, after being infected with COVID-19.

== Recognition ==
- National awards: Order of the Red Banner of Labour (1986), USSR State Prize (1988), Order "For Merit to the Fatherland" (IV class) (1996), State Prize of the Russian Federation (1997), Medal "In Commemoration of the 850th Anniversary of Moscow" (1998), Order "For Merit to the Fatherland" (III class) (1999), Jubilee Medal "300 Years of the Russian Navy" (2000), Order of Honour (2006), Order of Friendship (2011), Order of Alexander Nevsky (2013), Order "For Merit to the Fatherland" (II class) (2016).
- International awards: Hannes Alfvén Prize (2003), UNESCO Albert Einstein medal (2005), Order of Merit of the Federal Republic of Germany (2006), Legion of Honour (2006), Dr. Phil. Nat. Honoris Causa of Goethe University Frankfurt (2010). Global Energy Prize (2013).
