= Valery Vasilevich Kozlov =

Russian mathematician and mathematical physicist

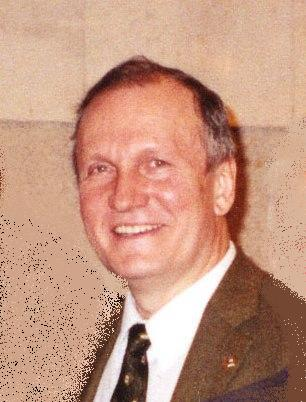
Valery Koslov

Valery Vasilevich Kozlov (Валерий Васильевич Козлов, born 1 January 1950 in Ryazan Oblast) is a Russian mathematician and mathematical physicist.

== Education and career ==
Kozlov studied from 1967 at the Moscow State University with his undergraduate degree in 1972 and his Candidate of Sciences degree in 1974 under Andrei Kolmogorov with thesis Качественное исследование движения тяжёлого твёрдого тела в интегрируемых случаях (Qualitative study of the motion of a heavy rigid body in integrable cases). At Moscow State University he was a lecturer and assistant and completed in 1978 his Russian Doctor of Sciences degree (habilitation) in 1978 with thesis Вопросы качественного анализа в динамике твёрдого тела (Questions of qualitative analysis in the dynamics of a rigid body). At Moscow State University he became in 1983 a professor of theoretical mechanics and in 2002 the head of the Department of Mathematical Statistics and Random Processes. At the Steklov Institute of Mathematics he became in 2003 head of the mechanics department and in 2004 the Institute's deputy director.

From 1980 to 1987 he was Moscow State University's deputy dean for science and research of the Faculty of Mathematics and Mechanics. From 1997 to 2001 he was Deputy Minister of Education of the Russian Federation.

Kozlov's research deals with theoretical and statistical mechanics and related mathematical areas such as the qualitative theory of differential equations and topological considerations in the integrability of dynamic systems. In 1979 he proved that for 2-dimensional manifolds $M$ with genus greater than 1 (i.e. excluding topological spheres and tori) the geodetic flow (and general solutions of Hamilton's equations on the associated tangential bundle of $M$) has no real-analytic first integrals other than energy.

He was elected in 1997 a corresponding member and in 2000 a full member of the Russian Academy of Sciences. He became the Academy's vice-president in 2001 and was its acting president for a few months in 2017 (upon the resignation of Vladimir Fortov). Kozlov is also a member of the Serbian Academy of Sciences and Arts and the European Academy of Arts and Sciences.

Kozlov was the founder and editor-in-chief of the journal Regular and Chaotic Dynamics.

In 2007 he received the Leonhard Euler Gold Medal of the Russian Academy of Sciences and in 2018 its Demidov Prize, in 2009 the Gili Agostinelli Prize of the Turin Academy of Sciences, in 2000 the Kovalevskaya Prize of the Russian Academy of Sciences Sciences and in 1988 its Chaplygin Prize. and in 1994 the State Prize of the Russian Federation.

== Selected publications ==
=== Articles ===
- Topological obstructions to the integrability of natural mechanical systems, Doklady Akad. Nauka SSSR, vol. 249, 1979, pp. 1299–1302 (English translation, Sov. Math. Doklady, vol. 20, 1979, pp. 1413–1415)
- Integrability and non-integrability in Hamiltonian mechanics, Russian Mathematical Surveys, vol. 38, 1983, pp. 1–76 doi:10.1070/RM1983v038n01ABEH003330
- Calculus of variations in the large and classical mechanics, Russian Mathematical Surveys, vol. 40, 1985, issue 2 doi:10.1070/RM1985V040N02ABEH003557
- with Alexander Harin: Kepler's problem in constant curvature spaces, Celestial Mechanics and Dynamical Astronomy, vol. 54, 1992, pp. 393–399 doi:10.1007/BF00049149

=== Books ===
- Kozlov, Valeriĭ V.; Treshchëv, Dmitriĭ V. (5 August 1991). Billiards: A Genetic Introduction to the Dynamics of Systems with Impacts: A Genetic Introduction to the Dynamics of Systems with Impacts. American Mathematical Soc. ISBN 9780821845509.
- Kozlov, Valeriĭ V., ed. (1995). Dynamical Systems in Classical Mechanics. Translations of the American Mathematical Society, Series 2. Vol. 168. American Mathematical Soc. ISBN 978-0-8218-0427-8.
  - Fedorov, Yuri N., and Valery V. Kozlov. "Various aspects of n-dimensional rigid body dynamics." (1995): 141-172. (book chapter in Dynamical Systems in Classical Mechanics)
- Arnold, Vladimir I.; Kozlov, Valery V.; Neishtadt, Anatoly I. (5 July 2007). Mathematical Aspects of Classical and Celestial Mechanics: Dynamical Systems III. Encyclopaedia of Mathematical Sciences. Vol. 3 (3rd ed.). ISBN 978-3-540-48926-9.
- Kozlov, Valerij V. (6 December 2012). Symmetries, Topology and Resonances in Hamiltonian Mechanics. Springer. ISBN 978-3-642-78393-7.
- Kozlov, Valery V.; Furta, Stanislav D. (13 January 2013). Asymptotic Solutions of Strongly Nonlinear Systems of Differential Equations. Springer Science & Business Media. ISBN 978-3-642-33817-5.
