= Boris Saltykov =

Russian politician

- Борис Салтыков
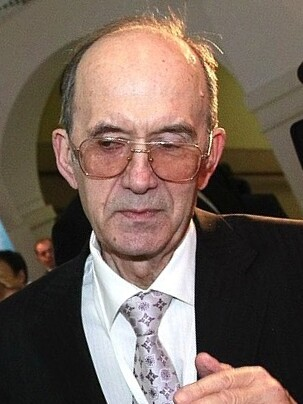
- Saltykov in 2011

Deputy Prime Minister of Russia
- In office 4 June 1992 – 5 March 1993
- President: Boris Yeltsin
- Prime Minister: Boris Yeltsin; Yegor Gaidar (acting); Viktor Chernomyrdin

Minister of Science and Technology
- In office 3 December 1991 – 14 August 1996
- President: Boris Yeltsin
- Preceded by: Ministry created
- Succeeded by: Vladimir Fortov

Personal details
- Born: Boris Georgiyevich Saltykov; 27 December 1940 Moscow, Russian SFSR, Soviet Union
- Died: 1 July 2025 (aged 84) Moscow, Russia
- Party: Democratic Choice of Russia
- Education: Moscow Institute of Physics and Technology
- Occupation: Politician
- Profession: Engineer

Boris Georgiyevich Saltykov (Russian: Борис Георгиевич Салтыков; 27 December 1940 – 1 July 2025) was a Russian politician and engineer. He held several cabinet portfolios in the government of Russia during the 1990s. Saltykov was the Minister of Science and Technology from 1992 to 1996 and a Deputy Chairman of the Government of the Russian Federation from 1992 to 1993. From 1993 to 1996, he was also a deputy of the State Duma.

== Government service ==
After the collapse of the Soviet Union, Boris Saltykov was appointed both the Minister of Science and Technology, as well as Deputy Prime Minister for education, in 1992. Although he would be demoted from that latter post in 1993, he held the former office until 1996. During this time Saltykov was regarded as being a key member of Yegor Gaidar's reform team. He acknowledged at one point that the Russian middle class was being decimated by the government's economic policies. Although Prime Minister Viktor Chernomyrdin initially retained most of Gaidar's original team, it ended up disintegrating by March 1993, with Saltykov stepping down from the deputy premiership that month.

In the 1993 Russian legislative election, Saltykov was elected as a State Duma deputy from the party Democratic Choice of Russia.

In March 1996, in his capacity as science and technology minister, Saltykov visited a conference with NATO discussing increased scientific cooperation between Russia and the bloc. Other concerns he addressed included property rights of Russian scientists.

He was dismissed as science minister in August 1996, at which point the ministry was downgraded to a state committee. It was revived in 1997, however, with Vladimir Fortov appointed to the post in Saltykov's place—a candidate that Saltykov supported for the position.

== Later work ==
From 1996 to 2003, he was a member of the Strategic Committee of the Open Society Institute (Soros Foundation), overseeing the "Establishment of Internet Centers Network" program. As of 2004, Saltykov was one of the trustees of Mikhail Khodorkovsky's foundation in the United Kingdom.

From March 7, 1998 to April 27, 2000, he served as Director General of the federal state unitary enterprise Russian Technologies.

He was President of the non-profit partnership Innovation Agency, and also Chairman of the Board of Directors of the publishing house Summa Technologies.

He was President of the Association for the Advancement of Science and Technology Museums (AMNIT).

He taught at the Higher School of Economics (HSE), where he was a Professor in the Department of Science and Innovation Management, Faculty of Social Sciences. He was also a member of the Academic Council of the Russian Research Institute of Economics, Politics and Law in Science and Technology (RIEPP), and held the title of professor.

He was co-head of the working group responsible for developing a long-term forecast for the scientific and technological development of the Russian Federation through 2025.

In 1999, he was elected a foreign member of the American Academy of Arts and Sciences, Division of Public Relations and Business Administration.

In July 2010, he was appointed Director General of the Polytechnic Museum.

In July 2013, it was announced that he had been appointed President of the Polytechnic Museum.

== Bibliography ==
- Pallin, Carolina (2008). Russian Military Reform: A Failed Exercise in Defence Decision Making. Taylor & Francis. ISBN 978-0203892398.
- Sakwa, Richard (2002). Russian Politics and Society. Routledge. ISBN 978-0415415286.
- Shevchenko, Iulia (2004). The Central Government of Russia: From Gorbachev to Putin. Routledge. ISBN 978-0754639824.
