= Nemytskii operator =

In mathematics, Nemytskii operators are a class of nonlinear operators on L^{p} spaces with good continuity and boundedness properties. They take their name from the mathematician Viktor Vladimirovich Nemytskii.

== General definition of Superposition operator ==
Let $\mathbb{X},\ \mathbb{Y},\ \mathbb{Z} \neq \varnothing$ be non-empty sets. Let $\mathbb{Y}^ \mathbb{X},\ \mathbb{Z}^\mathbb{X}$ denote the sets of mappings from $\mathbb{X}$ to $\mathbb{Y}$ and $\mathbb{Z}$ respectively. Let $h\ \colon \mathbb{X} \times \mathbb{Y} \to \mathbb{Z}$.

Then the Nemytskii superposition operator $H\ \colon \mathbb{Y}^\mathbb{X} \to \mathbb{Z}^\mathbb{X}$ induced by $h$ is the map taking any map $\varphi \in \mathbb{Y}^\mathbb{X}$ to the map $H\varphi \in \mathbb{Z}^\mathbb{X}$ defined by
$$(H\varphi)(x) = h(x, \varphi(x)) \in \mathbb{Z}, \quad \mbox{for all}\ x\in \mathbb{X}.$$
The function $h$ is called the generator of the Nemytskii operator $H$.

== Definition of Nemytskii operator ==
Let Ω be a domain (an open and connected set) in n-dimensional Euclidean space. A function f : Ω × R^{m} → R is said to satisfy the Carathéodory conditions if

- f(x, u) is a continuous function of u for almost all x ∈ Ω;
- f(x, u) is a measurable function of x for all u ∈ R^{m}.

Given a function f satisfying the Carathéodory conditions and a function u : Ω → R^{m}, define a new function F(u) : Ω → R by

$$F(u)(x) = f \big( x, u(x) \big).$$

The function F is called a Nemytskii operator.

== Theorem on Lipschitzian Operators ==
Suppose that $h: [a, b] \times \mathbb{R} \to \mathbb{R}$, $X = \text{Lip} [a, b]$ and

$$H: \text{Lip} [a, b] \to \text{Lip} [a, b]$$

where the operator $H$ is defined as $\left( Hf \right) \left(x\right)$ $= h(x, f(x))$ for any function $f : [a,b] \to \mathbb{R}$ and any $x \in [a,b]$. Under these conditions the operator $H$ is Lipschitz continuous if and only if there exist functions $G, H \in \text{Lip} [a, b]$ such that

$$h(x, y) = G(x)y + H(x), \quad x \in [a, b], \quad y \in \mathbb{R}.$$

== Boundedness theorem ==
Let Ω be a domain, let 1 < p < +∞ and let g ∈ L^{q}(Ω; R), with

$$\frac1{p} + \frac1{q} = 1.$$

Suppose that f satisfies the Carathéodory conditions and that, for some constant C and all x and u,

$$\big| f(x, u) \big| \leq C | u |^{p - 1} + g(x).$$

Then the Nemytskii operator F as defined above is a bounded and continuous map from L^{p}(Ω; R^{m}) into L^{q}(Ω; R).
