= Institute of Plant and Animal Ecology =

Russian biological research institute

Technical University of UMMC
- Russian: Институт экологии растений и животных УрО РАН
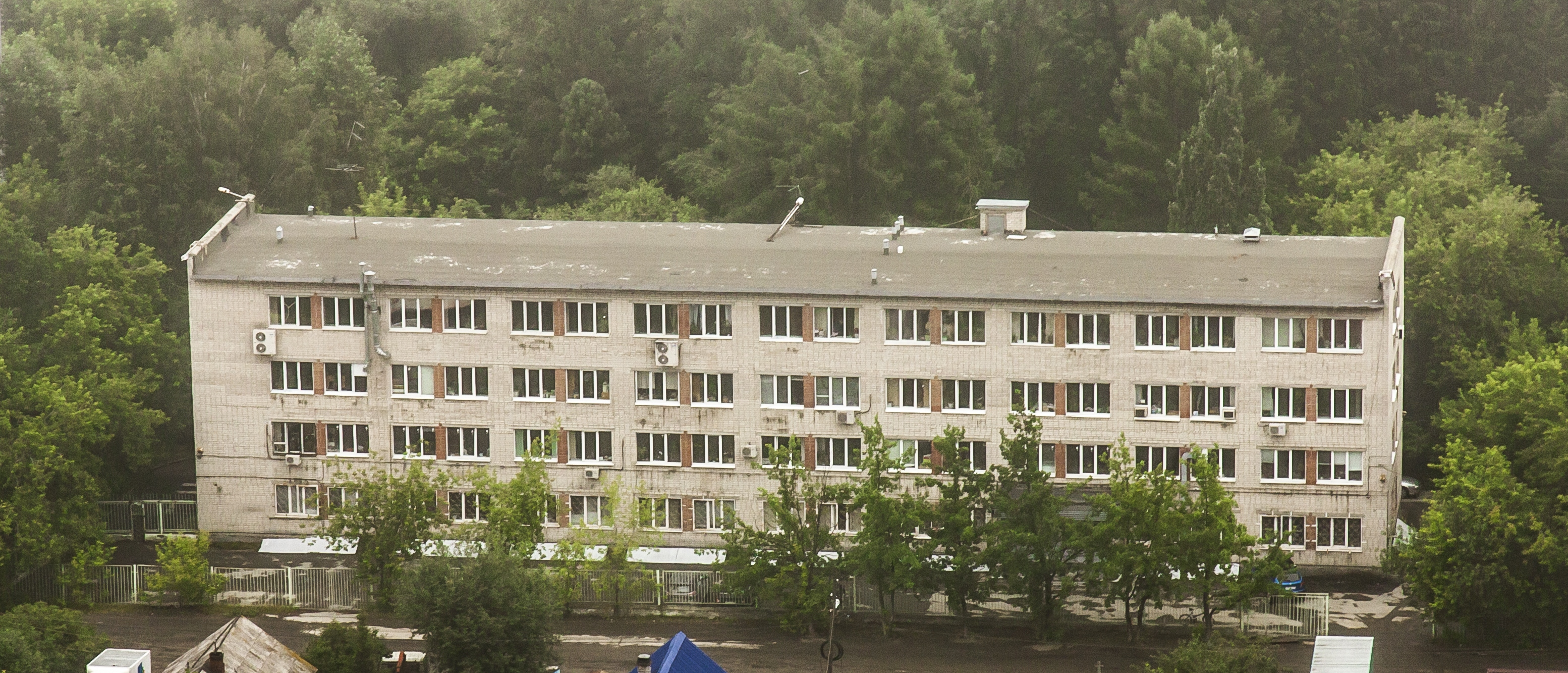
- Established: 1944
- Affiliation: Russian Academy of Sciences
- Location: Yekaterinburg, Sverdlovsk Oblast, Ural Federal District, Russia
- Website: ipae.uran.ru

The Institute of Plant and Animal Ecology is a biological research Institute in Yekaterinburg. The institute is part of the Russian Academy of Sciences.
