= Gennady Krasnikov =

- Геннадий Красников
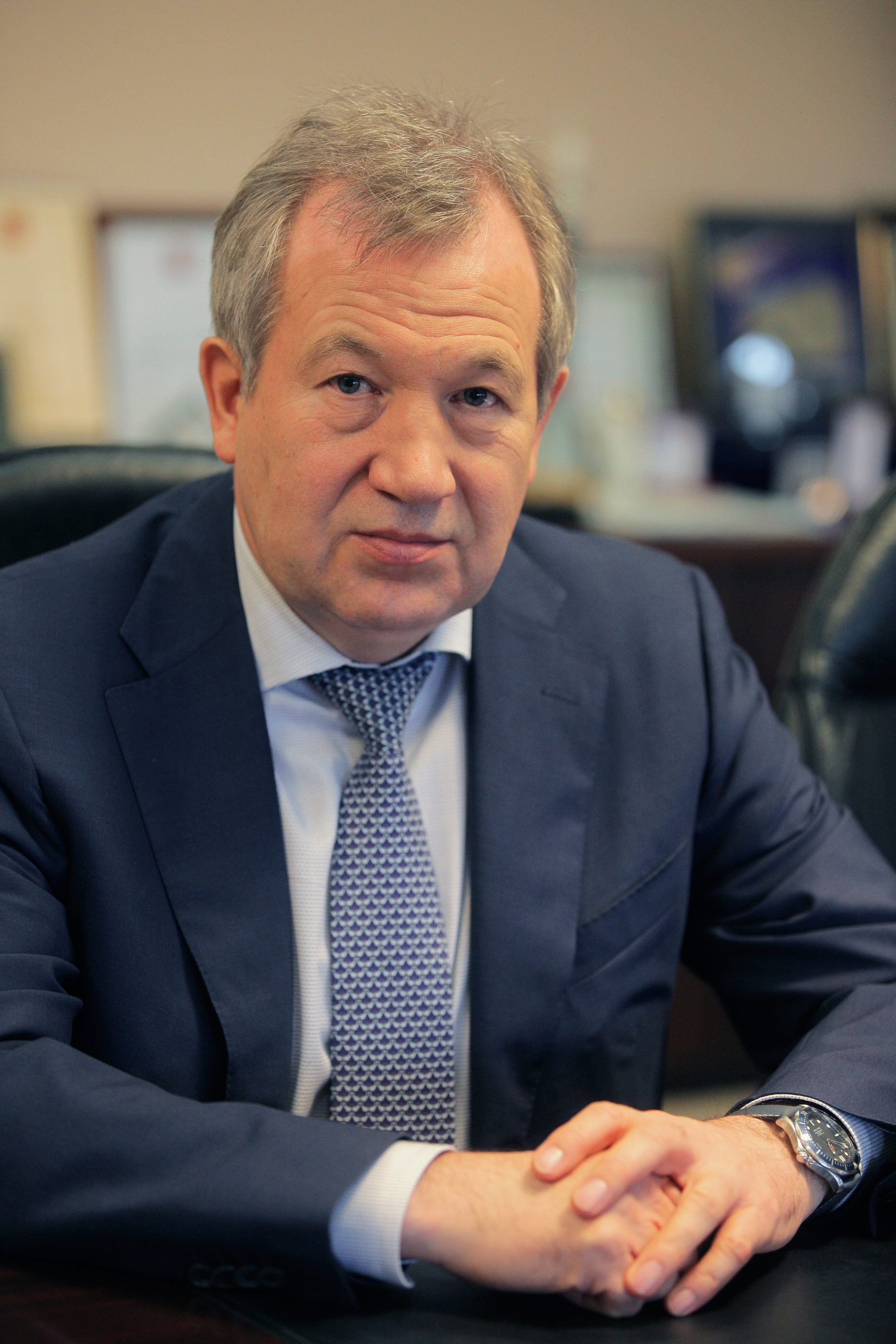
- Krasnikov in 2018
- Born: 30 April 1958 (age 68); Tambov, Tambov Oblast
- Citizenship: Russian
- Education: National Research University of Electronic Technology
- Known for: President of the Russian Academy of Sciences
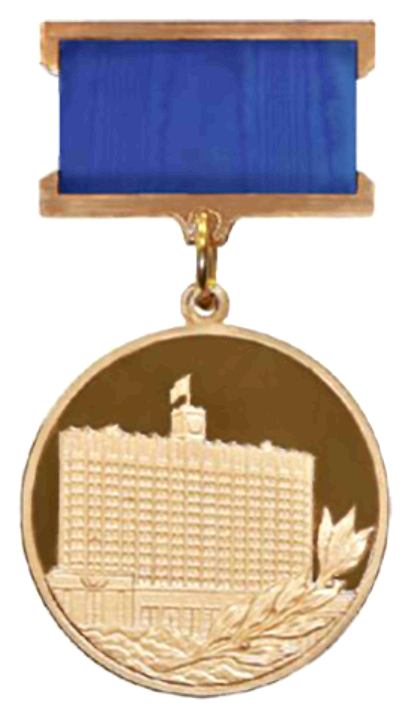
- Awards: (2014) (1999, 2009, 2019)

Gennady Yakovlevich Krasnikov (Russian: Геннадий Яковлевич Красников; born 30 April 1958) is a Russian scientist in the field of semiconductor physics who has been serving as the president of the Russian Academy of Sciences since 2020.

== Biography ==
Krasnikov graduated with honors from the Faculty of Physics and Technology of the Moscow Institute of Electronic Technology in 1981. From 1981, he successively held various positions, as engineer at the Research Institute of Molecular Electronics and the Mikron plant up to the General Director of JSC NIIME and Mikron (from 1991 to 2016). In September 2017, he participated in the election for the president the Russian Academy of Sciences, passed the approval procedure required by the new rules in the government of the Russian Federation. He is head of the Priority Technological Area for Electronic Technologies of the Russian Federation and a member of the Advisory Scientific Council of the Skolkovo Innovation Center. On 12 December 2022, he became a member of the expert council under the Government of Russia. On January 15, 2024, by decree of President Vladimir Putin, Gennady Krasnikov was introduced to the Security Council of the Russian Federation.
