= Yury Osipov =

Soviet and Russian mathematician (1936)

- Юрий Осипов
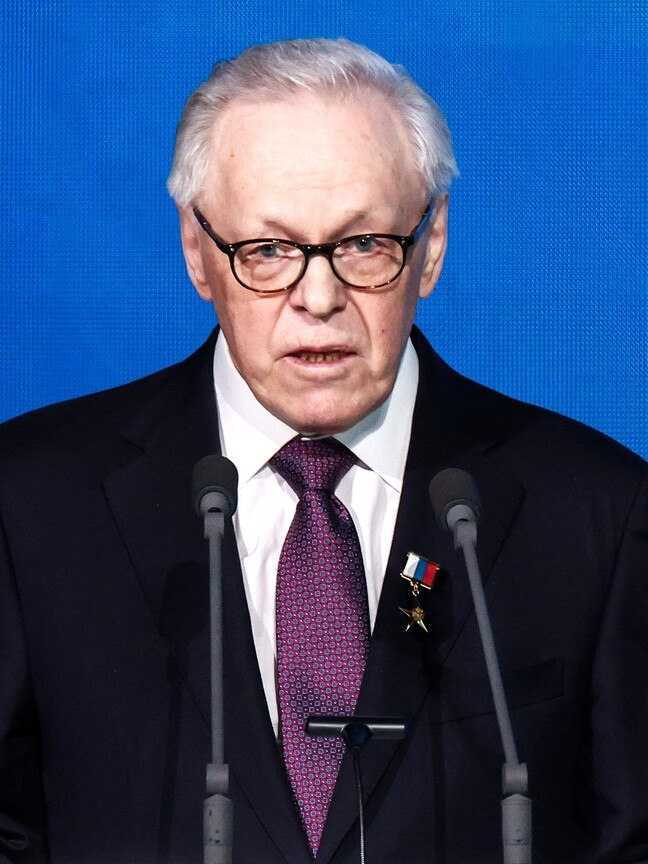
- Osipov in February 2024

President of the Russian Academy of Sciences
- In office 17 December 1991 – 29 May 2013
- Preceded by: Gury Marchuk
- Succeeded by: Vladimir Fortov

Personal details
- Born: 7 July 1936 (age 90) Tobolsk, Soviet Union
- Citizenship: Russia
- Education: Ural State University
- Profession: Mathematician

Yury Sergeyevich Osipov (Russian: Ю́рий Серге́евич О́сипов; born 7 July 1936) is a Soviet and Russian mathematician. He was elected a full member of the Academy of Sciences of the Soviet Union in 1987 and was a president of its successor, the Russian Academy of Sciences from 17 December 1991 to 29 May 2013.

== Biography ==
Osipov was born in Tobolsk. In 1959 he graduated from the Department of Mechanics and Mathematics of the Ural State University. His teacher was Nikolay Krasovsky, scientist and founder of the Ural scientific school in mathematical theory of control and the theory of differential games. From 1961 to 1969 he worked at the Ural State University. From 1970 to 1993 he worked at the Institute of Mathematics and Mechanics of the Ural Branch of the Academy of Sciences of the Soviet Union (later, of the Russian Academy of Sciences) in Yekaterinburg (from 1986 to 1993 he was the chief of the Institute). In 1971 he defended his second thesis and received the rank of professor in 1973. In 1984 he was elected corresponding member and in 1987, full member of the Academy of Sciences of the Soviet Union (Division of Machine Engineering, Mechanics and Control Processes Problems).

He has been the President of the Academy of Sciences of the Soviet Union and its successor, the Russian Academy of Sciences, since 1991, having been reelected in 1996, 2001 and 2006. He is also involved in the Russian government, specifically as a member of the Security Council of the Russian Federation.

Since 1993 Osipov has also served as the director of the V. A. Steklov Mathematical Institute in Moscow. He holds a concurrent appointment as a professor of the Moscow State University.

== Honours ==
- Full member (1987) and the President of the Russian Academy of Sciences (since 1991)
- Lenin Prize (1976)
- Order of the Red Banner of Labour (1986)
- State Prize of the Russian Federation (1993)
- Leonhard Euler Gold Medal of the Russian Academy of Sciences for outstanding results in mathematics and physics (1997)
- Order of Prince Yaroslav the Wise, 4th class (1999)
- Order "For Merit to the Fatherland" of 3rd (1996), 2nd (1999), 1st (2006), and 4th (2013) classes
- Cyril and Methodius Prize of the Russian Orthodox Church
- Member of the European Academy of Sciences and Arts
- Order of Merit (Ukraine) of 3rd (2002) and 1st (2011) classes
- Order of the Legion of Honour (2003)
- Demidov Prize (2010)
- Commandeur of the Legion of Honour (2011)
- Nagrada Braca Karic (2011)
- Order of Alexander Nevsky (2011)
- Order of Honour (2016)

== Gallery ==
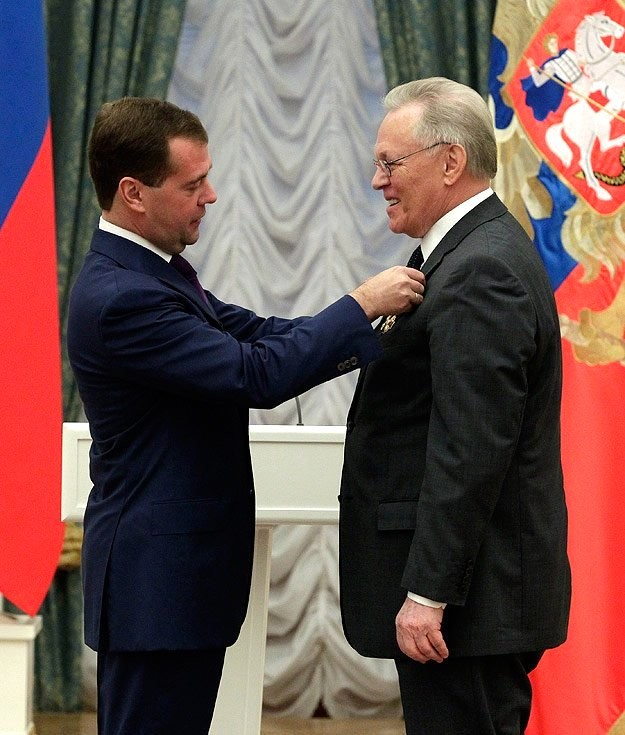
Awarding of the Order of Alexander Nevsky (October 10, 2011)

Academic offices
Preceded by Gury Marchuk	President of the Russian Academy of Sciences; 1991–2013	Succeeded by Vladimir Fortov
