= Vyacheslav Stepanov =

Vyacheslav Vassilievich Stepanov
- Вячеслав Васильевич Степанов
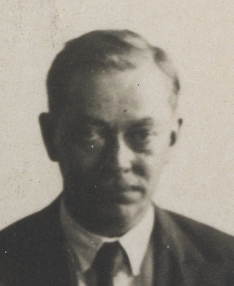
- Stepanov at a topological congress in Moscow 1935
- Born: September 4, 1889; Smolensk
- Died: July 22, 1950 (aged 60); Moscow
- Education: Lomonosov Moscow State University
- Awards: Order of the Badge of Honour, USSR State Prize
- Scientific career
- Fields: Mathematician
- Thesis: (1915)
- Doctoral advisor: Dimitri Fedorowitsch Egorov
- Doctoral students: Mikhail Bebutov, Boris Budak, Aleksandr Gelfond, Viktor Nemytskii

Vyacheslav Vassilievich Stepanov (Вячеслав Васильевич Степанов; 4 September 1889, Smolensk – 22 July 1950, Moscow) was a mathematician, specializing in analysis. He was from the Soviet Union.

Stepanov was the son of teachers and from 1908 to 1912 studied mathematics at the Faculty of Mechanics and Mathematics of Moscow State University, where in 1912 he received his Candidate of Sciences degree with Dmitri Egorov as thesis supervisor. Stepanov was also strongly influenced by Nikolai Lusin. In 1912 he undertook further study at the University of Göttingen where he attended lectures by Edmund Landau and David Hilbert. In 1915 he returned to Moscow and became a docent at Moscow State University, where he worked closely with Egorov until 1929 when Egorov was dismissed from his position as director of the Institute of Mechanics and Mathematics. In 1928 Stepanov became a professor at Moscow State University and then in 1939 also the Director of the Institute of Mechanics and Mathematics, where he continued until his death in 1950.

In two publications (1923 and 1925) Stepanov gave necessary and sufficient conditions for a function of two variables, defined on a set S of measure greater than zero, to have a total differential almost everywhere on S. He also worked on dynamical systems (extending the work of George Birkhoff), the qualitative theory of ordinary differential equations, and almost periodic functions (extending the work of Harald Bohr). In the qualitative theory of ordinary differential equations Stepanov wrote a well-known textbook with his student Viktor Nemytskii. Stepanov played an important role in the Moscow Mathematical Society and was the founder of a Russian school in the qualitative theory of differential equations and dynamical systems theory.

In addition to Nemytskii, his doctoral students include Alexander Gelfond.

In 1946 Stepanov became a member of the Soviet Academy of Sciences.

== Works ==
- With Julia Rozanska: “Sketch of development of the topology in the USSR for a period of ten years” Mat. Sb., 1928, Volume 35, Number supplementary, Pages 43–61
- With Viktor V. Nemytskii: Qualitative Theory of Differential Equations, Princeton University Press 1960, Dover 1989
- Lehrbuch der Differentialgleichungen, Berlin, Deutscher Verlag der Wissenschaften, 6th edition 1956

== Contributions ==
- Ryzhik, Iosif Moiseevich (Рыжик, Иосиф Моисеевич) (1936). Специальные функции: Собрание формул и вспомогательные таблицы [Special functions: A collection of formulas and an auxiliary table] (in Russian) (1 ed.). Moscow / Leningrad: Объединенное научно-техническое издательство (НТИБ), ONTI (ОНТИ). Гострансизд-во. Глав. ред. общетехнич. лит-ры и номографии. Archived from the original on 9 April 2016. (160 pages) (According to an entry in the Russian State Library (RSL), Stepanov wrote or contributed the preface. See also: Gradshteyn-Ryzhik)
- Ryzhik, Iosif Moiseevich (Рыжик, Иосиф Моисеевич) (1943). Таблицы интегралов, сумм, рядов и произведений [Tables of integrals, sums, series and products] (in Russian) (1 ed.). Moscow: Gosudarstvennoe Izdatel'stvo Tehniko-Teoretičeskoj Literatury (Государственное издательство технико-теоретической литературы) (GITTL / ГИТТЛ) (Tehteoretizdat / Техтеоретиздат). LCCN ltf89006085. (400 pages) (According to the foreword of 1st edition, Stepanov provided suggestions and advice. See also: Gradshteyn-Ryzhik)
