= Energy Research Institute of the Russian Academy of Sciences =

Russian research institute

Founded in July 1985, the Energy Research Institute of the Russian Academy of Sciences (ERIRAS) was originally an outgrowth of the general energy department at the Institute for High Temperatures RAS (IVTAN). The staff at the newly formed organization comprised professionals gathered from other scientific organizations. At the time of its creation, ERIRAS' challenge was to develop the basic content and quantitative substantiation for the Energy Program of the USSR. The first director of ERIRAS was Lev Aleksandrovich Milentyev, an Academician of the Russian Academy of Sciences. At present, Academician Aleksei Aleksandrovich Makarov is the director of the institute.

It is sanctioned.

== Organization ==
The Institute employs approximately 80 staff members. It comprises eight scientific departments:

- Laboratory for the study of the interconnections between economics and energy
- Laboratory for the study of the improvement of energy consumption and energy savings
- Laboratory for the modeling of energy markets
- Laboratory for research on the methodology of energy policy development
- Laboratory for the study of the regulation and development of oil and gas systems
- Laboratory for the study of the regulation and development of electricity and heat systems
- Laboratory for the study of the regulation and development of the coal industry
- Centre for the study of international energy markets

== Activities ==
The institute's mission is to find solutions to a wide range of contemporary challenges including: efficient energy production and consumption techniques to promote energy savings; appropriate pricing mechanisms for energy markets; and legislation, tax policy and other general issues related to domestic energy policy.

ERIRAS work is divided into the following research areas:

- the study of the regularities of energy development
- the modeling of energy development
- the theory and methods of energy system studies
- the creation of a scientific basis for energy policy and the mechanisms for its implementation
- the identification of the rational spheres and magnitudes of energy savings, and the mechanisms for energy saving policy implementation which take into consideration environmental concerns
- the study of the priorities in energy technical policy
- the identification of rational mechanisms for the regulation of energy development within a market framework, including primary legislation, pricing techniques, and tax and investment policy
- the forecasting of energy markets
- the creation of a scientific basis for the development of the oil & gas industry
- the creation of a scientific basis for the development of the energy sectors (electricity & heat)
- the creation of a scientific basis for the development of the coal industry
