= Alexander Sergeev (physicist) =

Aleksandr Sergeev
- Александр Сергеев
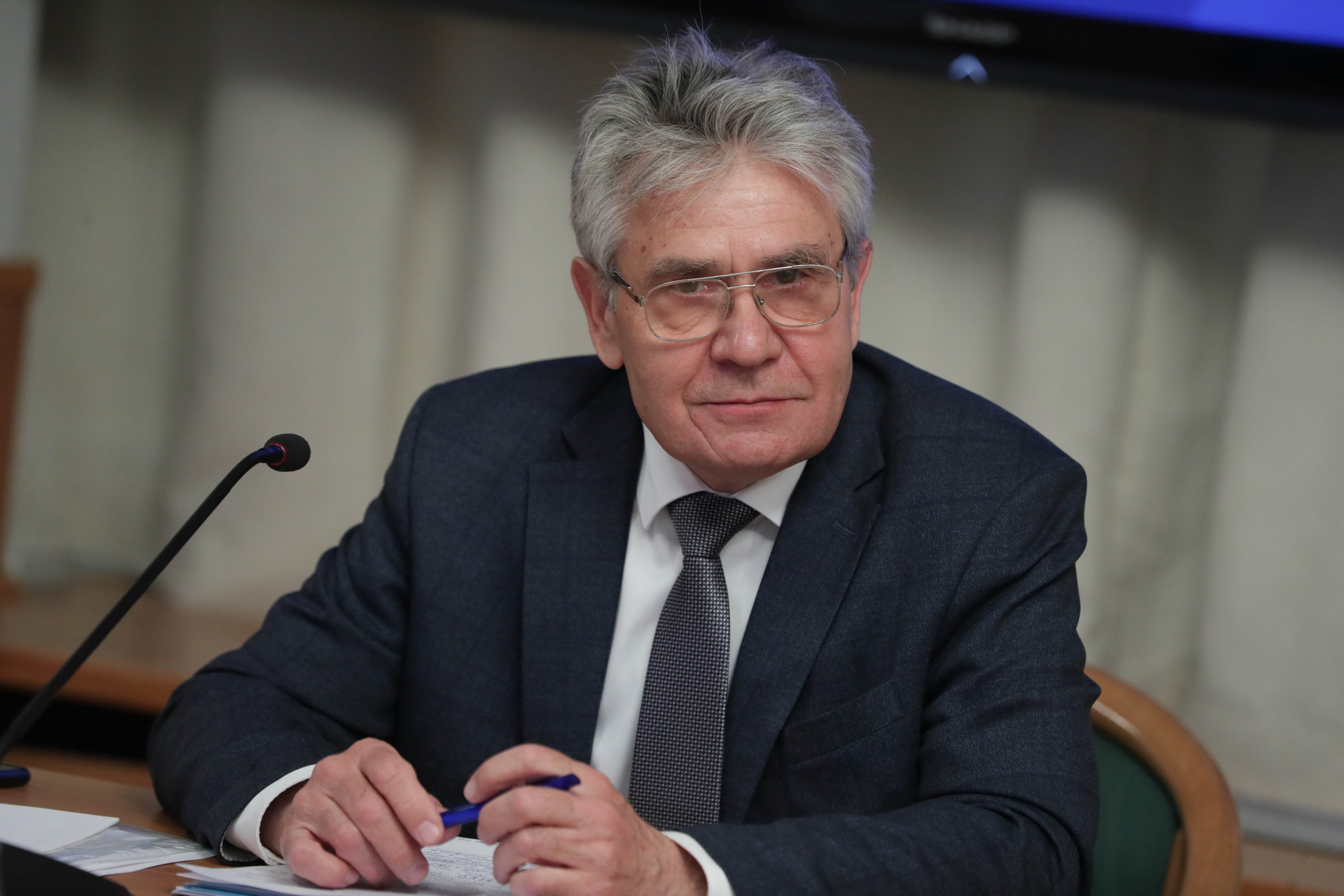
- Sergeev in 2022
- Born: 2 August 1955 (age 71); Buturlino, Nizhny Novgorod Oblast
- Citizenship: Russian
- Education: N. I. Lobachevsky State University of Nizhny Novgorod
- Known for: President of the Russian Academy of Sciences
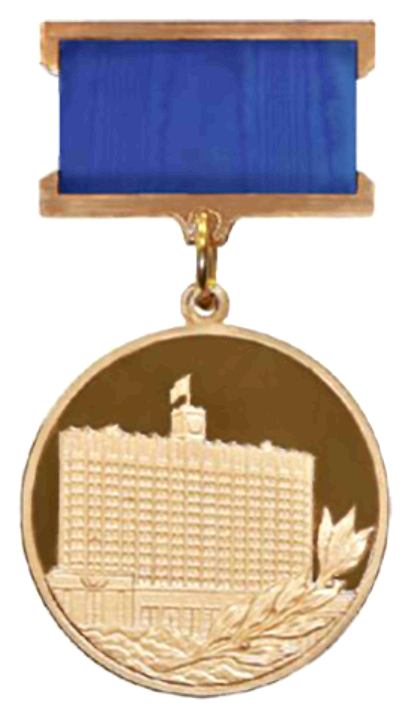
- Awards: (1999) (2012)
- Scientific career
- Academic advisors: Aleksandr Litvak

Aleksandr Mikhaylovich Sergeyev (Russian: Александр Михайлович Сергеев; born 2 August 1955) is a Russian physicist. In 2017-2022 he was the president of the Russian Academy of Sciences.

Sergeev was born in Buturlino, Gorky Oblast and studied physics at Gorky State University, graduating in 1977. After the graduation, he worked as a researcher at the Institute of Applied Physics of the Russian Academy of Sciences at Gorky, currently Nizhny Novgorod. He received his PhD (Cand. Sci.) in 1982, and spent his whole scientific career at the same institute. In 2015, he became the director of the institute.

The main research interest of Sergeev is nonlinear phenomena in physics including plasma physics and physics of femtosecond lasers. Specifically, he guided development of petawatt-class laser in the Institute of Applied Physics RAS.
