= Viktor Nemytskii =

Soviet mathematician (1900–1967)

- Born: Viktor Vladimirovich Nemytskii; 22 November 1900; Smolensk, Russian Empire
- Died: 7 August 1967 (aged 66); Chulcha, Altai Republic, Altai Krai, RSFSR, Soviet Union
- Citizenship: Soviet Union
- Education: Moscow State University
- Known for: Nemytskii operator, Nemytskii plane
- Spouse: Nina Bari
- Awards: Order of the Red Banner of Labour
- Scientific career
- Fields: Mathematics
- Workplaces: Moscow State University
- Doctoral advisor: Pavel Alexandrov, Vyacheslav Stepanov

Viktor Vladimirovich Nemytskii (Russian: Виктор Владимирович Немыцкий; 22 November 1900 – 7 August 1967) was a Soviet mathematician who introduced Nemytskii operators and the Nemytskii plane (Moore plane). He was married to Nina Bari, who was also a mathematician.

== Works ==
- V. V. Nemytskii; V. V. Stepanov (1989). Qualitative Theory of Differential Equations. Dover Books on Mathematics. Dover Publications. ISBN 978-0486659541.
