= Institute of Chemical Biology and Fundamental Medicine =

Russian research institute

Coordinates: 54.8504°N 83.1044°E

Institute of Chemical Biology and Fundamental Medicine of the Siberian Branch of the RAS
- Established: 1984
- Director: Dmitry Pyshny
- Owner: Siberian Branch of the Russian Academy of Sciences
- Address: Lavrentyev Prospekt 8, Novosibirsk, 630090, Russia
- Location: Novosibirsk, Russia
- Website: www.niboch.nsc.ru

Institute of Chemical Biology and Fundamental Medicine of the Siberian Branch of the RAS, ICBFM SB RAS (Russian: Институт химической биологии и фундаментальной медицины СО РАН, ИХБФМ СО РАН) is a research institute in Novosibirsk, Russia. It was founded in 1984.

== History ==
The Institute of Chemical Biology and Fundamental Medicine (formerly the Novosibirsk Institute of Bioorganic Chemistry) was founded on 1 April 1984.

== Scientific activity ==
Creation of gene-targeted biological preparations, developments in the field of gene therapy, the study of physical and chemical processes of transmission and preservation of hereditary information.

=== Test system for detection of SARS-CoV-2 Omicron variant ===
At the end of 2021, the staff of the ICBFM SB RAS, together with scientists from Saint Petersburg, created a test system that simultaneously detects the presence of the genetic material of the coronavirus and determines whether it belongs to the omicron strain.

=== Method for inactivating the CRISPR/Cas9 genome editing system at a specific point in time ===
The CRISPR/Cas9 genome editing was discovered by molecular biologists Jennifer Doudna (United States) and Emmanuelle Charpentier (France), thanks to which they received the Nobel Prize.

Scientists at the ICBFM SB RAS have developed a method to inactivate the CRISPR/Cas9 genome editing system at a specific point in time.

In 2022, the institute received a patent for the invention – Modified guide RNA which has the ability to inactivate the CRISPR/Cas9 genome editing system, and method for obtaining it (Модифицированная направляющая РНК, обладающая способностью инактивировать систему редактирования генома CRISPR/Cas9, и способ ее получения).
