= Nina Bari =

Russian mathematician

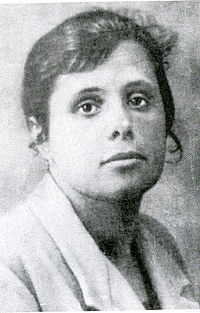
- Nina Bari, circa 1930
- Born: 19 November 1901; Moscow, Russian Empire
- Died: 15 July 1961 (aged 59); Moscow, Russian SFSR, Soviet Union
- Education: Moscow State University
- Scientific career
- Fields: Mathematics
- Workplaces: Moscow State University
- Doctoral advisor: Nikolai Luzin
- Doctoral students: Pyotr Ulyanov

Nina Karlovna Bari (Russian: Нина Карловна Бари; 19 November 1901 – 15 July 1961) was a Soviet mathematician known for her work on trigonometric series. She is also well-known for two textbooks, Higher Algebra and The Theory of Series.

== Early life and education ==
Nina Bari was born in Russia on 19 November 1901, the daughter of Olga and Karl Adolfovich Bari, a physician. In 1918, she became one of the first women to be accepted by the Department of Physics and Mathematics at the prestigious Moscow State University. She graduated in 1921—just three years after entering the university. After graduation, Bari began her teaching career. She lectured at the Moscow Forestry Institute, the Moscow Polytechnic Institute, and the Sverdlov Communist Institute. Bari applied for and received the only paid research fellowship awarded by the newly created Research Institute of Mathematics and Mechanics. As a student, Bari was drawn to an elite group nicknamed the Luzitania—an informal academic and social organization. She studied trigonometric series and functions under the tutelage of Nikolai Luzin, becoming one of his star students. She presented the main result of her research to the Moscow Mathematical Society in 1922—the first woman to address the society.

In 1926, Bari completed her doctoral work on the topic of trigonometric expansions, winning the Glavnauk Prize for her thesis work. In 1927, Bari took advantage of an opportunity to study in Paris at the Sorbonne and the Collège de France. She then attended the Polish Mathematical Congress in Lwów, Poland; a Rockefeller grant enabled her to return to Paris to continue her studies. Bari's decision to travel may have been influenced by the disintegration of the Luzitanians. Luzin's irascible, demanding personality had alienated many of the mathematicians who had gathered around him. By 1930, all traces of the Luzitania movement had vanished, and Luzin left Moscow State for the Academy of Science's Steklov Institute of Mathematics. In 1932, she became a professor at Moscow State University and in 1935 was awarded the title of Doctor of Physical and Mathematical Sciences, a more prestigious research degree than traditional Ph.D. By this time, she had completed foundational work on trigonometric series.

== Career and later life ==
She was a close collaborator with Dmitrii Menshov on a number of research projects. She and Menshov took charge of function theory work at Moscow State during the 1940s. In 1952, she published an important piece on primitive functions, and trigonometric series and their almost everywhere convergence. Bari also posted works at the 1956 Third All-Union Congress in Moscow and the 1958 International Congress of Mathematicians in Edinburgh.

Mathematics was the center of Bari's intellectual life, but she enjoyed literature and the arts. She was also a mountain hiking enthusiast and tackled the Caucasus, Altai, Pamir and Tian Shan mountain ranges in the Soviet Union. Bari's interest in mountain hiking was inspired by her husband, Viktor Vladimirovich Nemytskii, a Soviet mathematician, Moscow State professor and an avid mountain explorer. There is no documentation of their marriage available, but contemporaries believe the two married later in life. Bari's last work—her 55th publication—was a 900-page monograph on the state of the art of trigonometric series theory, which is recognized as a standard reference work for those specializing in function and trigonometric series theory.

== Death ==
On 15 July 1961, Bari died after being hit by a train. It was possibly a suicide due to depression caused by Luzin's death eleven years earlier.
