= Lev Tumarkin =

Lev Abramovich Tumarkin
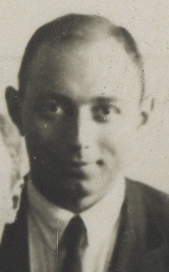
- Lev Tumarkin at the First Topological Conference, Moscow, 1935
- Born: January 14, 1904; Hadiach, Poltava Governorate, Russian Empire
- Died: August 1, 1974 (aged 70); Moscow, Soviet Union
- Education: Moscow State University (1925)
- Known for: Dimension theory Tumarkin's theorem Tumarkin's problem
- Scientific career
- Fields: Mathematics
- Workplaces: Moscow State University
- Doctoral advisor: Pavel Alexandrov

Lev Abramovich Tumarkin (Russian: Лев Абра́мович Тума́ркин; 14 January 1904 – 1 August 1974) was a Soviet mathematician who made significant contributions to topology, particularly in dimension theory. He served as dean of the Faculty of Mechanics and Mathematics at Moscow State University from 1935 to 1939.

== Biography ==
Tumarkin was born in Hadiach (then part of the Russian Empire's Poltava Governorate). He graduated from Moscow State University in 1925 and completed his postgraduate studies there in 1929 under the supervision of Pavel Alexandrov. He spent his entire academic career at Moscow State University, where he became a professor in 1932 and earned his doctorate in physical and mathematical sciences in 1936.

== Mathematical contributions ==
Tumarkin began his research career early, making notable contributions to topology while still an undergraduate. His main work focused on dimension theory.

- Between 1925 and 1928, Tumarkin proved that for topological spaces with countable base, the large and small inductive dimensions are equal: $\mathrm{Ind}\,X = \mathrm{ind}\,X$
- He showed that any n-dimensional space with countable base can be represented as a union of $n+1$ pairwise disjoint zero-dimensional sets
- Hurewicz–Tumarkin theorem (1927): Every n-dimensional compact space contains an n-dimensional Cantor manifold (proved independently by Witold Hurewicz)
- Tumarkin's theorem (1928): For any subset $M$ of a space $X$ with countable base, there exists a set $M'$ that is a union of countably many closed sets in $X$ such that $M = M'$ and $\dim M' = \dim M$
- In 1951, he proved that the weight of any one-dimensional compact space equals either two or three.
- In 1957, he demonstrated that every infinite-dimensional compact space either contains an infinite-dimensional Cantor manifold or contains compact sets of every finite dimension.

=== Tumarkin's problem ===
In 1925, Tumarkin posed the following problem:

Tumarkin's problem: Does there exist an infinite-dimensional compact set where every non-empty closed subset has dimension either zero or infinity?

The question remained open for over 40 years until American mathematician David W. Henderson provided a positive answer in 1967, showing that such "Tumarkin compacts" form a dense set in the space of all infinite-dimensional compact sets.

Soviet mathematicians Pavel Alexandrov and Andrey Kolmogorov described his teaching as "the fruit of many years of creative work and finished with filigree thoroughness." Mathematician Vladimir Arnold, one of Tumarkin's calculus students, praised his teaching on Arnold's website.

== Publications ==
- "Zur allgemeinen Dimensionstheorie" (1925) (in German)
- "Über die Dimension night abgeschlossener Mengen" (1928) (in German)
- "О покрытиях одномерных компактов" (1951) (in Russian)
- "О бесконечномерных канторовых многообразиях" (1957) (in Russian)
- "О сильно- и слабо-бесконечномерных пространствах" (1963) (in Russian)

== See also ==
- Dimension theory
