= Cybernetics in the Soviet Union =

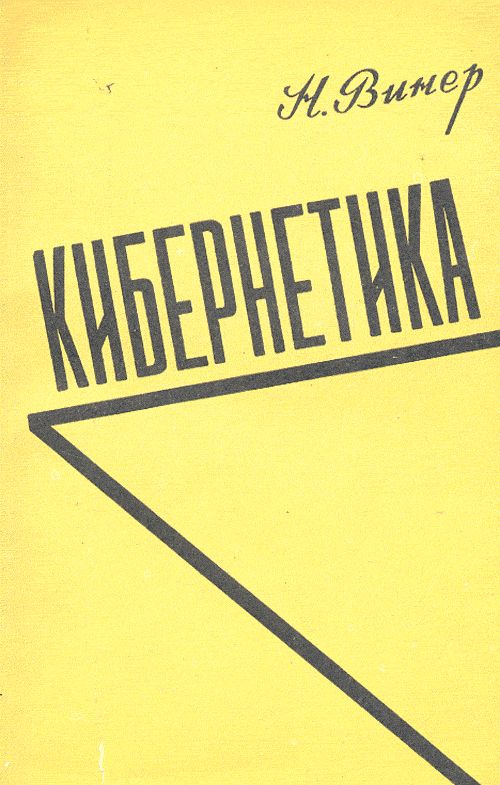
The first Russian edition of Norbert Wiener's Cybernetics from 1958. 1958 was a watershed year for the study of cybernetics in the Soviet Union, also seeing a translation of Wiener's The Human Use of Human Beings and the launch of Problems of Cybernetics, a Soviet journal dedicated to the study of cybernetics.

Cybernetics in the Soviet Union expressed its own particular characteristics, as the study of cybernetics, the transdisciplinary study of circular causal feedback within systems, came into contact with the dominant scientific ideologies of the Soviet Union and the nation's economic and political reforms. As the influence of these factors evolved, so too did Soviet attitudes of cybernetics; from the unmitigated anti-Americanist criticism of cybernetics in the early 1950s, its legitimization after Stalin's death and up to 1961, its total saturation of Soviet academia in the 1960s, and finally its eventual decline through the 1970s and 1980s.

Initially, from 1950 to 1954, the reception of cybernetics by the Soviet Union establishment was exclusively negative. The Soviet Department for Agitation and Propaganda had called for anti-Americanism to be intensified throughout Soviet media, and in an attempt to fill the Department's quotas, Soviet journalists latched on to cybernetics as an American "reactionary pseudoscience" to denounce and mock. These attacks were interpreted as a signal of an official attitude to cybernetics, Soviet writers thus portraying cybernetics as "a full embodiment of imperialist ideology” during Joseph Stalin's premiership,

Upon Stalin's death, the wide-reaching reforms of Nikita Khrushchev's premiership allowed cybernetics to legitimize itself as "a serious, important science", and in 1955, articles on cybernetics were published in the state philosophical organ, Voprosy Filosofii, after a group of Soviet scientists realized the potential of this new science.

Within the formerly suppressive scientific culture of the Soviet Union during the de-Stalinization of Khrushchev's premiership, cybernetics began to serve as an umbrella term for previously maligned areas of Soviet science, such as structural linguistics and genetics. Under the leadership of academician Aksel Berg, the Council of Cybernetics was formed, an umbrella organization dedicated to providing funding for these new lights of Soviet science. By the 1960s, this rapid legitimization thrust cybernetics into intellectual fashion, as "cybernetics" became a buzzword among career-minded scientists. Additionally, Berg's administration left many of the original cyberneticians amongst the organization disgruntled, fostering complaints that he seemed more focused on administrative matters than scientific research by citing Berg's grand plans to expand the council to subsume "practically all of Soviet science". By the 1980s, cybernetics had lost relevance in Soviet scientific culture, as its terminology and political function were succeeded by those of informatics in the Soviet Union and, eventually, post-Soviet states.

== Official criticism: 1950–1954 ==
Cybernetics: a reactionary pseudoscience that appeared in the U.S.A. after World War II and also spread through other capitalist countries. Cybernetics clearly reflects one of the basic features of the bourgeois worldview—its inhumanity, striving to transform workers into an extension of the machine, into a tool of production, and an instrument of war. At the same time, for cybernetics an imperialistic utopia is characteristic—replacing living, thinking man, fighting for his interests, by a machine, both in industry and in war. The instigators of a new world war use cybernetics in their dirty, practical affairs.

— "Cybernetics" in the Short Philosophical Dictionary, 1954

The initial reception of cybernetics in the stifling scientific culture of Soviet state-sanctioned media and academic publication was exclusively negative. Under the plans of the Soviet Department for Agitation and Propaganda, Soviet anti-American propaganda was to be intensified, in order "to show the decay of bourgeois culture and morals" and "debunk the myths of American propaganda" in the wake of the formation of NATO. This imperative put Soviet newspaper editors in a frantic search for topics to criticize, in order to fill these propagandistic quotas.

The first to latch onto cybernetics was science journalist, Boris Agapov, following the post-war American interest in the developments in computer technology. The cover of the January 23, 1950, issue of Time had boasted an anthropomorphic cartoon of a Harvard Mark III under the slogan "Can Man Build a Superman?". On 4 May 1950, Agapov published an article in the Literaturnaya Gazeta entitled "Mark III, a Calculator", ridiculing this American excitement at the "sweet dream" of the military and industrial uses of these new "thinking machines", and criticizing cybernetics originator Norbert Wiener as an example of the "charlatans and obscurantists, whom capitalists substitute for genuine scientists".

Though it was not commissioned by any Soviet authority and never mentioned the science by name, Agapov's article was taken as a signal of an official critical attitude towards cybernetics; editions of Wiener's Cybernetics were removed from library circulation, and several other periodicals followed suit, denouncing cybernetics as a "reactionary pseudoscience". In 1951, Mikhail Yaroshevsky, of the Institute of Philosophy, led a public campaign against the philosophy of "semantic idealism", (Note: "Semantic idealism" was an ideological term that gained currency after Stalin's criticisms of linguist Nicholas Marr for his "overvaluation of semantics and its misuse", and adopted as a general criticism of the "idealistic" nature of Western semantics. Yaroshevsky had first learned of cybernetics through an American journal of semantics, so he confused it for a subfield of Western semantics.) characterizing Wiener, and cybernetics as a whole, as a part of this "reactionary philosophy". In 1952, another more explicitly anti-cybernetic article was published in the Literaturnaya Gazeta, definitively starting the campaign and leading the way for a flurry of popular titles denouncing the topic. At the zenith of this criticism, an article in the October 1953 issue of the state ideological organ, Voprosy Filosofii, was published under the pseudonym "Materialist", entitled "Whom Does Cybernetics Serve?"; it condemned cybernetics as a "misanthropic pseudo-theory" consisting of "mechanicism turning into idealism", pointing to the American military as the "god whom cybernetics served".

During this period, Stalin himself never engaged in this rabid criticism of cybernetics, with the head of the Soviet Department of Sciences, Iurii Zhdanov, recalling that "he never opposed cybernetics" and made every effort "to advance computer technology" in order to give the USSR the technological advantage. Though the scale of this campaign was modest, with only around 10 anti-cybernetic publications being produced, Valery Shilov has argued it constituted a "strict directive to action" from the "central ideological organs", a universal declaration of cybernetics as a bourgeois pseudoscience to be criticized and destroyed.

Few of these critics had any access to primary sources on cybernetics. Agapov's sources were limited to the January 1950 issue of Time; the institute's criticisms were based on the 1949 volume of ETC: A Review of General Semantics; and, among Soviet articles on cybernetics, only the "Materialist" quoted Wiener's Cybernetics directly. Select sensational quotes of Wiener and speculations based "exclusively on the basis of other [Soviet] books already written on the same or similar subject", were used to characterize Wiener as both an idealist and a mechanicist, criticizing his supposed reduction of scientific and sociological ideas to mere "mechanical model[s]". Wiener's gloomy speculations on the "second industrial revolution" and the "assembly line without human agents" were distorted to brand him as a "technocrat", wishing for "the process of production realized without workers, only with machines controlled by the gigantic brain of the computer" with "no strikes or strike movements, and moreover no revolutionary insurrections". According to Slava Gerovitch, "each critic carried criticism one step further, gradually inflating the significance of cybernetics until it was seen as a full embodiment of imperialist ideology".

== Legitimization and rise: 1954–1961 ==
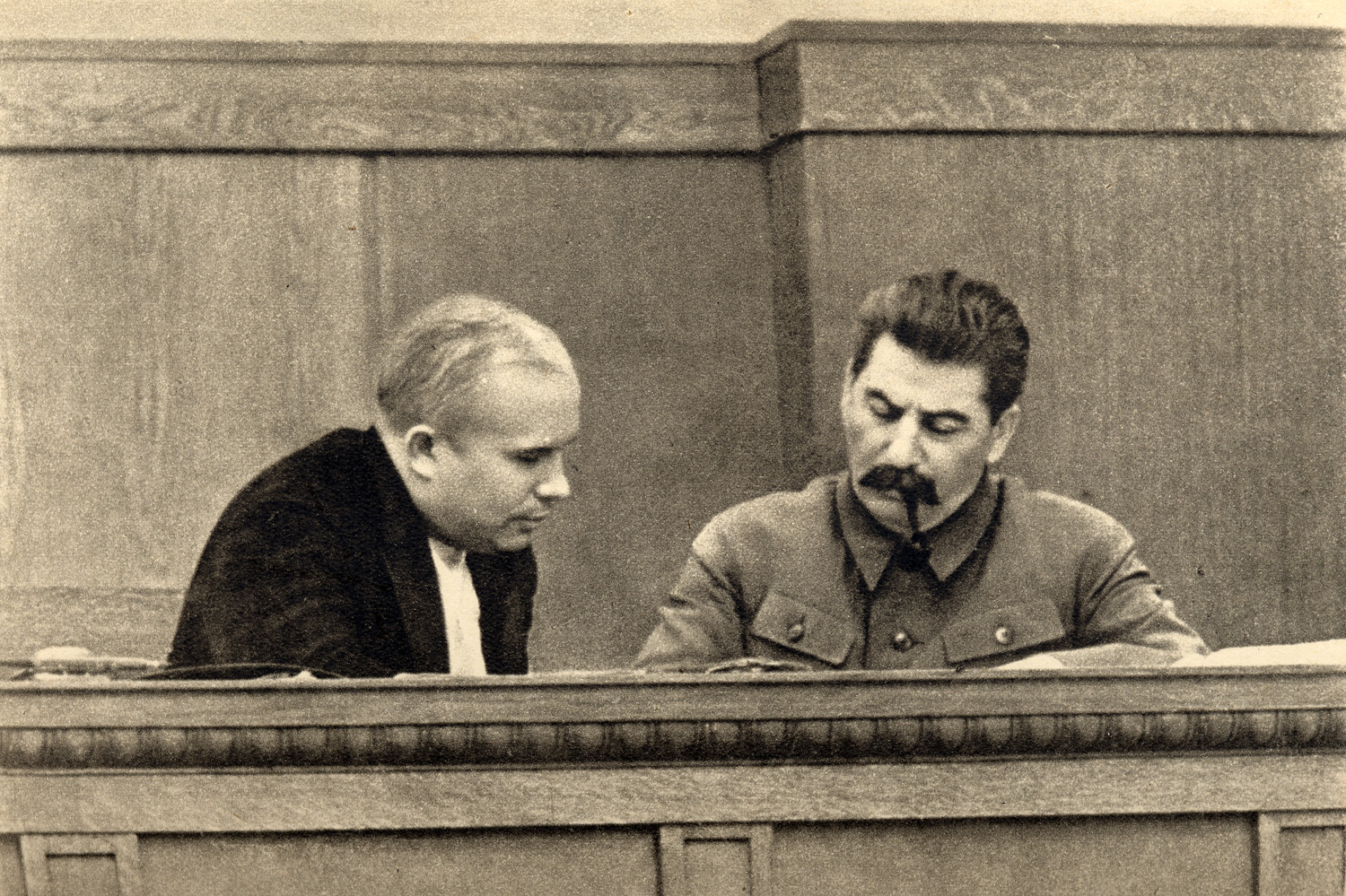
Joseph Stalin and Nikita Khrushchev, 1936; the death of Stalin (right) and accession of Khrushchev (left) in 1953, alongside the following political thaw, allowed cybernetics to be legitimized in the Soviet Union.

The reformed academic culture of the Soviet Union, after the death of Stalin and reforms of the Khrushchev era, allowed cybernetics to tear down its previous ideological criticisms and redeem itself in the public view. To Soviet scientists, cybernetics emerged as a possible vector of escape from the ideological traps of Stalinism, replacing it with the computational objectivity of cybernetics.

Military computer scientist Anatoly Kitov recalled stumbling onto Cybernetics in the secret library of the Special Construction Bureau and realizing instantly that "cybernetics was not a bourgeois pseudo-science, as official publications considered it at the time, but the opposite—a serious, important science". He joined with the dissident mathematician Alexey Lyapunov, and, in 1952, presented a pro-cybernetic paper to Voprosy Filosofii, which the journal tacitly endorsed, though the Communist Party required that Lyapunov and Kitov present public lectures on cybernetics before its publication, with 121 seminars produced in total from 1954 until 55.

A very different academic, the Soviet philosopher and former ideological watchdog Ernst Kolman, also joined this rehabilitation. In November 1954, Kolman presented a lecture at the Academy of Social Sciences, condemning this stifling of cybernetics to a shocked audience, who had expected a lecture rehearsing previous Stalinist criticisms, and marched down to the office of Voprosy Filosofii to have his lecture published.

The beginning of a Soviet cybernetic movement was therefore first signalled by two articles, published together in the July–August 1955 volume of Voprosy Filosofii: "The Main Features of Cybernetics" by Sergei Sobolev, Alexey Lyapunov, and Anatoly Kitov, and "What is Cybernetics" by Ernst Kolman. According to Benjamin Peters, these "two Soviet articles set the stage for the revolution of cybernetics in the Soviet Union".

The first article—authored by three Soviet military scientists—attempted to present the tenets of cybernetics as a coherent scientific theory, retooling it for Soviet use; they purposely avoided any discussion of philosophy, and presented Wiener as an American anti-capitalist, in order to avoid any politically dangerous confrontation. They asserted cybernetics' main tenets as:

1. information theory,
2. the theory of automatic high-speed electronic calculating machines as a theory of self-organizing logical processes,
3. the theory of automatic control systems (particularly, the theory of feedback).

In contrast, Kolman's defense of cybernetics mirrored the Stalinist criticisms it had endured. Kolman created a spurious historiography of cybernetics (which inevitably found its origins in Soviet science) and corrected the supposed "deviations" of the anti-cybernetic philosophers, employing well-placed quotes from Marxist authorities and philosophical epithets (e.g. "idealist" or "vitalist"), implying cybernetics' opponents fell into the same philosophical errors Marx and Lenin had criticized decades earlier, within their dialectical materialist framework.

In 1955, the Computing Center of the USSR Academy of Sciences was established and began operating in Moscow.

With this, Soviet cybernetics began its journey towards legitimization. Academician Aksel Berg, at the time deputy minister of defense, authored secret reports beleaguering the deficient state of information science in the USSR, pointing towards the suppression of cybernetics as the prime culprit. Party officials allowed a small Soviet delegation to be sent to the First International Congress on Cybernetics in June 1956, and they informed the Party of the extent to which USSR was "lagging behind the developed countries" in computer technology. Unfavorable descriptions of cybernetics were removed from official literature, and in 1958, the first Russian translations of Wiener's Cybernetics and The Human Use of Human Beings were published.

Alongside these translations, in 1958 the first Soviet journal on cybernetics, Проблемы кибернетики (Problems of Cybernetics), was launched with Lyapunov as its editor. For the 1960 First International Federation of Automatic Control, Wiener came to Russia to lecture on cybernetics at the Polytechnic Museum. He arrived to see the booked hall swarmed with scientists eager to hear his lecture, some of whom sat on aisles and stairs to hear him speak; several Soviet publications, including the formerly anti-cybernetic Voprosy Filosofii, crammed in to get interviews from Wiener. Wiener himself spoke to American newspapers about this enormous enthusiasm for cybernetic research. In the Krushchev Thaw, Soviet cybernetics had not only been legitimized as a science, but had entered the vogue in Soviet academia.

Q: On your last trip to Russia, did you find the Soviets placing much emphasis on the computer?
A: I'll tell you how much emphasis they're placing on it. They have an institute in Moscow. They have an institute in Kiev. They have an institute in Leningrad, They have one in Yerevan in Armenia, in Tiflis, in Samarkand, in Tashkent and Novosibirsk. They may have others.
Q: Are they making full use of this science, in a way comparable to ours?
A: The general verdict, and this is from many different people, is that they're behind us in hardware not hopelessly, but slightly. They are ahead of us in the theorization of automatization.

— An American interview with Wiener, published in 1964.

On 10 April 1959, Berg sent a report edited by Lyapunov to a presidium of the Academy of Sciences, recommending the establishment of an organization dedicated to advancing cybernetics. The presidium determined that the Council on Cybernetics would be formed, with Berg as the chairman (due to his strong administrative connections) and Lyapunov his deputy. This council was wide-reaching, subsuming as many as 15 disciplines as of 1967, from "cybernetic linguistics" to "legal cybernetics". During Khrushchev's relaxation of scientific culture, the Council on Cybernetics served as an umbrella organization for formerly suppressed research, including such subjects as non-Pavlovian physiology ("physiological cybernetics"), structural linguistics ("cybernetic linguistics"), and genetics ("biological cybernetics").

Thanks to Lyapunov, a further, 20-person Department of Cybernetics was created to solicit official funding for cybernetic research. Even with these institutions, Lyapunov still lamented that "the field of cybernetics in our country is not organized", and, from 1960 to 1961, worked with the department to establish an official Institute of Cybernetics. Lyapunov joined forces with the structural linguists, who had been authorized to create the Institute of Semiotics directed by Andrey Markov Jr., and, in June 1961, together planned to create an Institute of Cybernetics. Despite these efforts, Lyapunov lost faith in the project after Krushchev's refusal to build more Moscow scientific institutes, and the institute never emerged, settling with the Council of Cybernetics instead gaining the formal powers of an institute, without any expansion of staff.

== Peak and decline: 1961–1980s ==
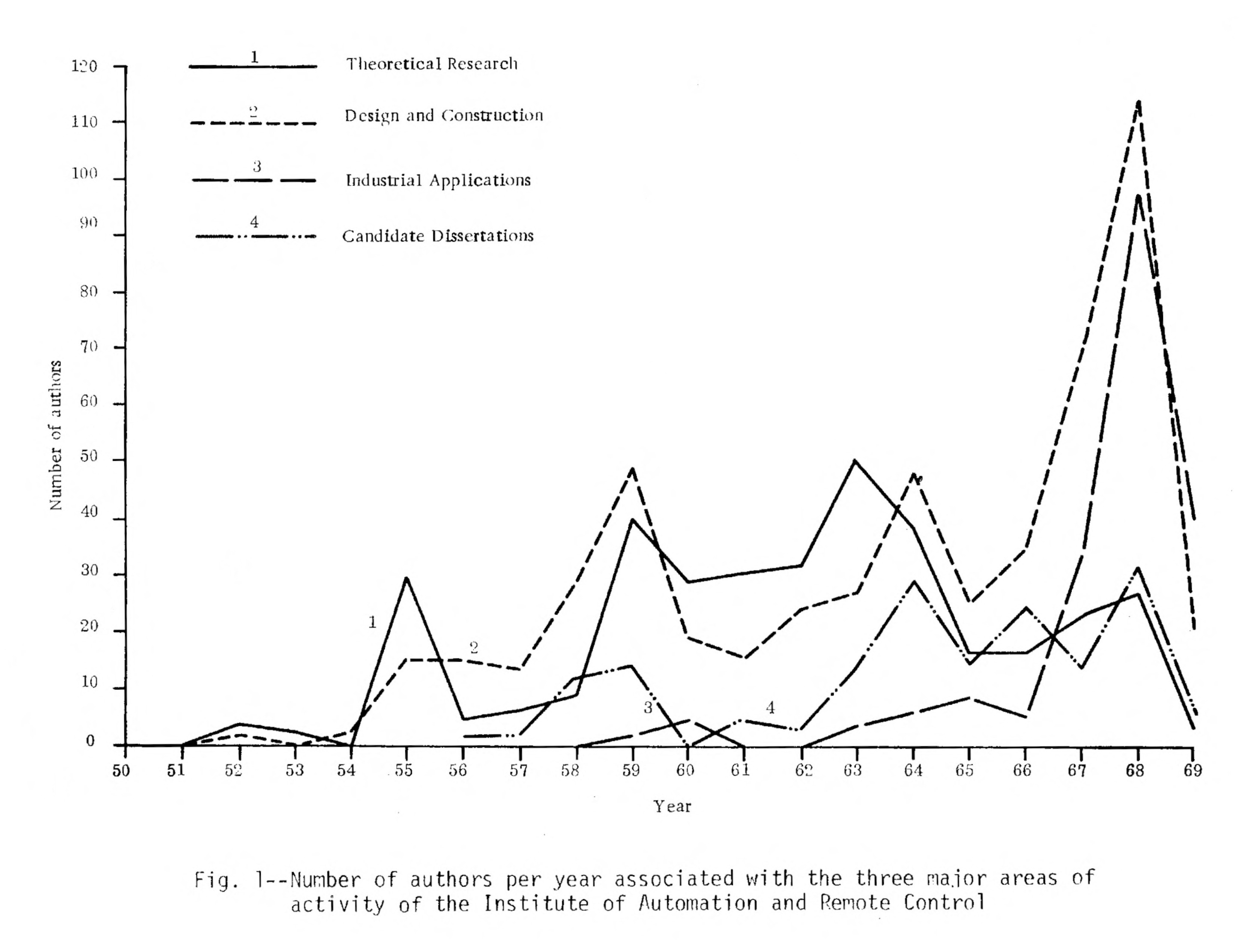
Number of authors engaged in each discipline of the Institute of Automation and Remote Control, from 1950 to 1969. From a report commissioned by the United States Department of Defense.

Berg continued with his campaign for Soviet cybernetics into the 1960s, as cybernetics entered the Soviet mainstream. Berg's council sponsored pro-cybernetic programs in Soviet media. 20-minute radio broadcasts, entitled "Cybernetics in Our Lives", were produced; a series of broadcasts on Moscow TV detailed advances in computer technology; and hundreds of lectures were given before various party members and workers on the subject of cybernetics. In 1961, the council produced an official volume proffering cybernetics as a socialist science: entitled Cybernetics—in the Service of Communism.

The work of the council was rewarded when, at the 22nd Party Congress, cybernetics was declared one of the "major tools of the creation of a communist society". Khrushchev declared the development of cybernetics an "imperative" in Soviet science. According to Gerovitch, this put cybernetics "in fashion" as "many career-minded scientists began using 'cybernetics' as a buzzword" and the movement swelled with its new membership. The CIA reported that the July 1962 'Conference on the Philosophical Problems of Cybernetics' received "approximately 1000 specialists, mathematicians, philosophers, physicists, economists, psychologists, biologists, engineers, linguists, physicians". American intelligence apparently bought into the hype, though it confused institutional enthusiasm with Soviet government policy. Special Assistant Arthur Schlesinger Jr warned President John F. Kennedy that the Soviet commitment to cybernetics provided them "a tremendous advantage" in technology and economic productivity; in the absence of any complementary American program, Schlesinger wrote, "we are finished".

In July 1962, Berg created a plan for the radical restructuring of the Council such that it covered "practically all of Soviet science". This was met with cold reception from many of the researchers of the council, with one cybernetician complaining, in a letter to Lyapunov, that "[t]here are almost no results from the Council. Berg only demands paperwork and strives for the expansion of the Council." Lyapunov, disgruntled with Berg and the non-academic direction of cybernetics, refused to write for Cybernetics—in the Service of Communism and gradually lost his influence in cybernetics. As one memoirist put it, this resignation meant that "the center that had unified cybernetics disappeared, and cybernetics [would] naturally split into numerous branches."

The Council's expanding remit also provided a setting for a later, limited recovery of Alexander Bogdanov's earlier Tektology, a theory of universal organization. In 1964, it established a Section on Theoretical Questions of Organization, whose research was published in the Organizatsiia i upravlenie series. George Gorelik described Tektology as an important reference work in the Soviet organization-theory literature he reviewed, and noted that the emerging science of organization drew on it alongside cybernetics, systems theory, information theory, bionics and praxeology. This was a later development in organization and systems research: the first positive Soviet encyclopaedia entry on cybernetics had named Norbert Wiener, Claude Shannon and John von Neumann, rather than Bogdanov.

Due to the increase in the number of cars and the increase in the intensity of traffic in Moscow, it became necessary to improve the efficiency of traffic management. In 1964, on the instructions of the city authorities, the automation and telemechanics department of the Mosgortransproekt Institute began studying the possibility of introducing automatic traffic control in the capital. As a result, in 1964-1968 the START system was created - from that time on, remote control of traffic lights in Moscow was carried out via telephone wires by two computers. The improvement in traffic efficiency during the first three years in 1964-1967 paid for all the costs of creating this system.

In 1967, the All-Union Society "Znanie" increased the number of thematic areas of published popular science literature. As a result, the series "Physics, Mathematics, Astronomy" was divided into two separate series - "Physics & Astronomy" and "Mathematics & Cybernetics". Since 1967, the issues of the series "Mathematics & Cybernetics" have been published monthly

While the old guard of cyberneticians complained, the cybernetics movement, as a whole, was exploding; with the council subsuming 170 projects and 29 institutions by 1962, and 500 projects and 150 institutions by 1967.

In 1968, a commission for the application of mathematical methods and computers in historical research was created in the historical department of the Academy of Sciences of the USSR, headed by I. D. Kovalchenko. The effectiveness of automated processing and mathematical analysis of large volumes of statistical data using computers was noted (for example, in the simultaneous analysis of disparate fragments of information from many different medieval chronicles and manuscripts). In 1984, it was recommended to expand the use of computers in research organizations and educational institutions of the USSR.

Also, the spread of computers has made it possible to use them in forensic sciences for handwriting identification. In 1968, a written work was published with a theoretical justification for the possibility of using a computer for handwriting analysis. Subsequently, the first successful experiments in handwriting recognition with letter identification and word extraction were conducted, the results of which were published in 1969. In these experiments, the researchers used a Nairi computer with a special program written in the Autocode-Nairi programming language.

In 1970, the content of the academic discipline "Elements of Programming" was developed for students of pedagogical institutes of the USSR, and by the spring of 1971 a textbook was created (presented at a scientific conference on May 24–26, 1971 at the Krasnoyarsk State Pedagogical Institute).

According to Gerovitch, "by the early 1970s, the cybernetics movement [...] no longer challenged the orthodoxy; instead, tactical uses of cyberspeak overshadowed the original reformist goals that aspired the first Soviet cyberneticians." The ideas which were once seen as controversial, and huddled under the umbrella organization of cybernetics, now entered the scientific mainstream, leaving cybernetics as a loose and incoherent ideological patchwork. Some cyberneticians, whose dissident styles had been sheltered by the cybernetics movement, now felt persecuted, and some, such as Valentin Turchin, Alexander Lerner, and Igor Mel'čuk emigrated to escape this newfound scientific atmosphere. By the 1980s, cybernetics had lost its cultural relevance, being replaced in Soviet scientific culture with the concepts of 'informatics'.

In 1980, a first criminal offense in the USSR was solved with the help of a computer (a VAZ-2101 car that hit a pedestrian on the Moscow Highway in Tomsk and fled the scene was found as a result of a comprehensive analysis of all the traces left behind). In the period up to October 17, 1980, alone, computers were used to successfully solve more than 50 various crimes.

On September 11, 1984, the newspaper of the Ministry of Education, "Uchitelskaya Gazeta", published an article by corresponding member of the USSR Academy of Sciences A. P. Ershov on the need to include the subject "Computer Science" in the number of school subjects. In February 1985, a new specialized column, "Основы ЭВМ - всем, всем, всем!" ("Computer Basics - for Everyone, Everyone, Everyone!"), was created in the "Uchitelskaya Gazeta", dedicated to issues of teaching computer science and programming. The subject "Informatics and Computer Engineering" was included in the list of compulsory subjects in Soviet schools since September 1, 1985.

After the beginning of perestroika, the discussion intensified on how cybernetics should be developed further. At that time, the USSR was already producing serial standard computers that could be connected into local networks.

In 1985 in Leningrad computer began to be used to automatically analyze X-ray images of the internal organs of hospital patients.

Supporters of globalization and convergence believed that it was necessary to abandon the independent development of cybernetics and use “international” (Western) solutions - buy foreign-made computers, use foreign programming languages (FORTRAN, C, etc.). Japan was cited as an example of the success of such actions.

The use of computers in primary schools for teaching mathematics and Russian language took place in the 1988-1989 school year. In January 1990, foreign educational computer games were offered for school computers (these were the game "To the Moon on a Rocket" for teaching mathematics and the puzzle video game "Hare's Questions" for teaching geometry, made in Bulgaria)

== Notable Soviet cyberneticists ==
- Aksel Berg (1893–1979) Deputy Minister of Defense of the Soviet Union (September 1953–November 1957)
- Yuri Gastev (1928–1993) dissident who emigrated in 1981
- Victor Glushkov (1923–1982) Soviet mathematician and founding father of Soviet cybernetics
- Anatoly Kitov (1920–2005)
- Andrey Kolmogorov (1903–1987)
- Leonid Kraizmer (1912–2002)
- Alexey Lyapunov (1911–1973)
- Sergei Sobolev (1908–1989)

== See also ==
- Bibliography of science and technology in Russia and the Soviet Union

== Bibliography ==
- Бурас, Мария (2022). Лингвисты, пришедшие с холода. Moscow. ISBN 978-5-17-144664-2. OCLC 1293987701.
- Fet, Yakov (2014). Norbert Wiener in Moscow. 2014 Third International Conference on Computer Technology in Russia and in the Former Soviet Union. doi:10.1109/sorucom.2014.50.
- Ford, John J. (1966). "Soviet Cybernetics and International Development". In Dechert, Charles R. (ed.). The Social Impact of Cybernetics. Notre Dame: University of Notre Dame Press.
- Gerovitch, Slava (2002). From Newspeak to Cyberspeak: A History of Soviet Cybernetics. Cambridge, MA: The MIT Press. ISBN 9780262572255.
- Gerovitch, Slava (2009). "The Cybernetics Scare and the Origins of the Internet". Baltic Worlds. Vol. 2, no. 1. pp. 32–38.
- Gerovitch, Slava (9 April 2015). "How the Computer Got Its Revenge on the Soviet Union". Nautilus.
- Gorelik, George (1975). "Reemergence of Bogdanov's Tektology in Soviet Studies of Organization". Academy of Management Journal. 18 (2): 345–357. doi:10.5465/255536.
- Holloway, David (1974). "Innovation in Science—the Case of Cybernetics in the Soviet Union". Science Studies. 4 (4): 299–337. doi:10.1177/030631277400400401. S2CID 143821328.
- Kapitonova, Yu. V.; Letichevskii, A. A. (2003). "A Scientist of the XXIst Century". Cybernetics and Systems Analysis. 39 (4): 471–476. doi:10.1023/b:casa.0000003497.07568.d9. S2CID 195221399.
- Leeds, Adam E. (2016). "Dreams in Cybernetic Fugue: Cold War Technoscience, the Intelligentsia, and the Birth of Soviet Mathematical Economics". Historical Studies in the Natural Sciences. 46 (5): 633–668. doi:10.1525/hsns.2016.46.5.633.
- Malinovsky, Boris Nikolaevich (2010). Pioneers of Soviet Computing (PDF). Translated by Aronie, Emmanuel (2nd ed.). SIGCIS.
- Peters, Benjamin (2008). "Betrothal and Betrayal: The Soviet Translation of Norbert Wiener's Early Cybernetics". International Journal of Communication. 2: 66–80.
- Peters, Benjamin (2012). "Normalizing Soviet Cybernetics". Information & Culture. 47 (2): 145–175. doi:10.1353/lac.2012.0009. JSTOR 43737425. S2CID 144363003.
- Peters, Benjamin (2016). How Not to Network a Nation: The Uneasy History of the Soviet Internet. Cambridge, MA: The MIT Press. ISBN 9780262034180.
- Rindzeviciute, Egle (2010). "Purification and Hybridisation of Soviet Cybernetics: The Politics of Scientific Governance in an Authoritarian Regime". Archiv für Sozialgeschichte. 50: 289–309.
- Shilov, Valery (2014). Reefs of Myths: Towards the History of Cybernetics in the Soviet Union. 2014 Third International Conference on Computer Technology in Russia and in the Former Soviet Union. doi:10.1109/sorucom.2014.46. ISBN 978-1-4799-1799-0.
