= Alexey Lyapunov =

Soviet mathematician (1911–1973)

- Born: Alexey Andreyevich Lyapunov; October 8, 1911; Moscow, Russian Empire
- Died: June 23, 1973 (aged 61); Moscow, Soviet Union
- Education: Moscow State University
- Known for: Cybernetics; Programming theory
- Awards: Order of Lenin; Computer Pioneer Award
- Scientific career
- Fields: Mathematician; Cybernetics
- Workplaces: Steklov Mathematical Institute; Sobolev Institute of Mathematics; Novosibirsk State University
- Doctoral advisors: Nikolai Luzin; Pyotr Novikov
- Doctoral students: Andrey Yershov, Sergey Yablonsky, Rafail Krichevskii, Oleg Lupanov, Yuri Zhuravlyov

Alexey Andreyevich Lyapunov (Russian: Алексе́й Андре́евич Ляпуно́в; 8 October 1911 – 23 June 1973) was a Soviet mathematician and an early pioneer of computer science. One of the founders of Soviet cybernetics, Lyapunov was member of the Academy of Sciences of the Soviet Union and a specialist in the fields of real function theory, mathematical problems of cybernetics, set theory, programming theory, mathematical linguistics, and mathematical biology.

== Biography ==
Composer Sergei Lyapunov, mathematician Aleksandr Lyapunov, and philologist Boris Lyapunov were his close relatives.

In 1928, Lyapunov enrolled at Moscow State University to study mathematics, and in 1932 he became a student of Nikolai Luzin. Under his mentorship, Lyapunov began his research in descriptive set theory. He became world-wide known for his theorem on the range of an atomless vector-measure in finite dimensions, now called the Lyapunov Convexity Theorem.

From 1934 until the early 1950s, Lyapunov was on the staff of the Steklov Institute of Mathematics. When Mstislav Keldysh organized the Department of Applied Mathematics (now the M.V. Keldysh Institute of Applied Mathematics) he suggested Lyapunov to lead its work on programming.

In 1954 A.A. Lyapunov was invited by Anatoly Kitov (scientific director of the Computing Center No. 1 of the USSR Ministry of Defense) to this computing center as head of the laboratory. A.A. Lyapunov worked at this military computing center until 1960.

In 1961, Lyapunov moved to the Institute of Mathematics of the Siberian Division of the Academy of Sciences of the Soviet Union (now the Sobolev Institute of Mathematics), where he founded the department of cybernetics. At Novosibirsk State University, he founded the Department of Theoretical Cybernetics and the Laboratory of Cybernetics at the Institute of Hydrodynamics of the Siberian Division of the Academy of Sciences of the Soviet Union (now the Lavrentiev Institute of Hydrodynamics) which he led until the end of his life.

In 1964, Lyapunov was elected a member of the Academy of Sciences of the Soviet Union and joined the Division of Mathematics.

He was awarded the Order of the Red Star in 1944, Order of the Badge of Honour in 1953, two Orders of the Red Banner of Labour (1956 and 1967), and Order of Lenin in 1971. In 1996, he was awarded the IEEE Computer Society's Computer Pioneer Award.
