= The Main Features of Cybernetics =

"The Main Features of Cybernetics" (Russian: Основные черты кибернетики) was a key text which led to the emergence of cybernetics in the Soviet Union, published in July–August 1955 volume of the state philosophical organ, Voprosy filosofii (Problems of Philosophy), No. 4. pp. 136–148. The article was attributed to three significant soviet scientists, Sergei Sobolev, Alexey Lyapunov, and Anatoly Kitov and, for the first time, presented the tenets of cybernetics to a Soviet audience. Alongside the article "What is Cybernetics" by Ernst Kolman, published in the same volume, Benjamin Peters has considered this article to have "set the stage for the revolution of cybernetics in the Soviet Union".

Kitov was the principal author. He had been delivering a number of lectures about cybernetics since 1953. He negotiated with Sobolev and Lyapunov to become joint authors, which they eventually agreed to.

The article outlined three areas of cybernetics:

- Information theory, principally statistical approaches to processing and transmission of messages.
- The theory of automatic high-speed electronic calculating machines – computers as the theory of self-organizing logical processes.
- The theory of automatic control systems, principally feedback theory.

A political point was added at the end of the article:

"Foreign reactionary philosophers and writers strive to use cybernetics, like any new scientific field, in their class interests. By intensively advertising and often exaggerating the statements of individual cybernetic scientists concerning the achievements and prospects of the development of automation, reactionary journalists and writers carry out a direct order from the capitalists to inspire ordinary people to consider their own inferiority, about the possibility of replacing ordinary workers with mechanical robots and thus they seek to reduce the activity of the working masses in the fight against capitalist exploitation.
We must resolutely expose this manifestation of a hostile ideology. Automation in a socialist society serves to facilitate and increase human productivity."

== Impact ==
The mathematician Victor Glushkov was living in Sverdlovsk when he read the article along with Kitov's book Electronic digital machines. He saw the importance of cybernetics as being in relationship to computer science, and started leading a team working on the "Kiev Computer". Rather than seeing the computers as just a big adding machine, Glushkov approach meant working on areas which came to be called artificial intelligence.

== Text ==
- Основные черты кибернетики On-line Russian language copy of the text made available by Virtual Computer Museum.
