= Znanie =

Znanie (Russian: Знание, lit. 'knowledge'), or Znanie Society, may refer to:

== Educational/propaganda organizations ==
Several different educational/propaganda organizations associated with the Soviet Union and its successors:

- Znanie (educational organization, founded 1947) (officially: Znanie, the All-Union Society for the Dissemination of Political and Scientific Knowledge), a Soviet-era educational and propagandist foundation begun 1947.
  - Its post-Soviet successor in Russia from 1991 was the Znanie Society of Russia (educational organization, founded 1991), which was disbanded in 2016
  - Its post-Soviet successor in Ukraine from 1991 was the "Knowledge" Society of Ukraine
- Znanie (educational organization, founded 2015), a Russian state-sponsored foundation founded by presidential decree in 2015, unrelated to the other three

== Others ==
- Znanie (publishing company), a publishing company operating from 1898 to 1913 in St. Petersburg, Russia
