= Prescott Lecky =

American psychologist (1892–1941)

- Born: November 1, 1892; Virginia, United States
- Died: May 30, 1941 (aged 48); New York City, New York, United States
- Occupations: Psychologist, lecturer

Prescott Lecky (November 1, 1892 – May 30, 1941) was a lecturer of psychology at Columbia University from 1924 to 1934. At a time when American psychology was dominated by behaviorism, he developed the concept of self-help as a method in psychotherapy of the self in the 1920s.

Lecky's self-consistency theory is that self-consistency is a primary motivating force in human behavior. Lecky's theory concerned the organization of ideas of the self and the self's overall need for a "master" motive that serves to maintain for the self a consistency in ideas. Self-consistency theory remains relevant to contemporary personality and clinical psychologists. Lecky stressed the defense mechanism of resistance as an individual's method of regulating his self-concept.

He was well known as a psychologist and counseled John F. Kennedy when he was having trouble at Choate preparatory school.

His students gathered together his ideas and posthumously published them. His concepts influenced Maxwell Maltz in his writing of the classic self-help book, Psycho-Cybernetics (1960). George Kelly, in his book The Psychology of Personal Constructs (1955), also credits Lecky as an influence.

Lecky was born in Virginia and died in New York City. He was buried at Hollywood Cemetery in Richmond, Virginia.

== See also ==
- Self-concept
