= Cybernetics: Or Control and Communication in the Animal and the Machine =

1948 book written by Norbert Wiener

- Cover of first edition
- Author: Norbert Wiener
- Publication date: 1948
- OCLC: 1022297
- Text: Cybernetics: Or Control and Communication in the Animal and the Machine at MIT Press (2019 edition)

Cybernetics: Or Control and Communication in the Animal and the Machine is a book written by Norbert Wiener and published in 1948. It is the first public usage of the term "cybernetics" to refer to self-regulating mechanisms. The book laid the theoretical foundation for servomechanisms (whether electrical, mechanical or hydraulic), automatic navigation, analog computing, artificial intelligence, neuroscience, and reliable communications.

A second edition with minor changes and two additional chapters was published in 1961.

== Reception ==
The book aroused a considerable amount of public discussion and comment at the time of publication, unusual for a predominantly technical subject.

"[A] beautifully written book, lucid, direct, and, despite its complexity, as readable by the layman as the trained scientist, if the former is willing to forego attempts to understand mathematical formulas."
"One of the most influential books of the twentieth century, Cybernetics has been acclaimed as one of the 'seminal works' comparable in ultimate importance to Galileo or Malthus or Rousseau or Mill."
"Its scope and implications are breathtaking, and leaves the reviewer with the conviction that it is a major contribution to contemporary thought."
"Cybernetics... is worthwhile for its historical value alone. But it does much more by inspiring the contemporary roboticist to think broadly and be open to innovative applications."

The public interest aroused by this book inspired Wiener to address the sociological and political issues raised in a book targeted at the non-technical reader, resulting in the publication in 1950 of The Human Use of Human Beings.

== Table of contents ==
Introduction

1. Newtonian and Bergsonian Time

2. Groups and Statistical Mechanics

3. Time Series, Information, and Communication

4. Feedback and Oscillation

5. Computing Machines and the Nervous System

6. Gestalt and Universals

7. Cybernetics and Psychopathology

8. Information, Language, and Society

=== Supplementary chapters in the second edition ===
9. On Learning and Self-Reproducing Machines

10. Brain Waves and Self-Organising Systems

== Synopsis ==
=== Introduction ===
Wiener recounts that the origin of the ideas in this book is a ten-year-long series of meetings at the Harvard Medical School where medical scientists and physicians discussed scientific method with mathematicians, physicists and engineers. He details the interdisciplinary nature of his approach and refers to his work with Vannevar Bush and his differential analyzer (a primitive analog computer), as well as his early thoughts on the features and design principles of future digital calculating machines. He traces the origins of cybernetic analysis to the philosophy of Leibniz, citing his work on universal symbolism and a calculus of reasoning.

=== Newtonian and Bergsonian Time ===
The theme of this chapter is an exploration of the contrast between time-reversible processes governed by Newtonian mechanics and time-irreversible processes in accordance with the Second Law of Thermodynamics. In the opening section he contrasts the predictable nature of astronomy with the challenges posed in meteorology, anticipating future developments in Chaos theory. He points out that in fact, even in the case of astronomy, tidal forces between the planets introduce a degree of decay over cosmological time spans, and so strictly speaking Newtonian mechanics do not precisely apply.

=== Groups and Statistical Mechanics ===
This chapter opens with a review of the – entirely independent and apparently unrelated – work of two scientists in the early 20th century: Willard Gibbs and Henri Lebesgue. Gibbs was a physicist working on a statistical approach to Newtonian dynamics and thermodynamics, and Lebesgue was a pure mathematician working on the theory of trigonometric series. Wiener suggests that the questions asked by Gibbs find their answer in the work of Lebesgue. Wiener claims that the Lebesgue integral had unexpected but important implications in establishing the validity of Gibbs' work on the foundations of statistical mechanics. The notions of average and measure in the sense established by Lebesgue were urgently needed to provide a rigorous proof of Gibbs' ergodic hypothesis.

The concept of entropy in statistical mechanics is developed, and its relationship to the way the concept is used in thermodynamics. By an analysis of the thought experiment Maxwell's demon, he relates the concept of entropy to that of information.

=== Time Series, Information, and Communication ===
This is one of the more mathematically intensive chapters in the book. It deals with the transmission or recording of a varying analog signal as a sequence of numerical samples, and lays much of the groundwork for the development of digital audio and telemetry over the past six decades. It also examines the relationship between bandwidth, noise, and information capacity, as developed by Wiener in collaboration with Claude Shannon. This chapter and the next one form the core of the foundational principles for the developments of automation systems, digital communications and data processing which have taken place over the decades since the book was published.

=== Feedback and Oscillation ===
This chapter lays down the foundations for the mathematical treatment of negative feedback in automated control systems. The opening passage illustrates the effect of faulty feedback mechanisms by the example of patients with various forms of ataxia. He then discusses railway signalling, the operation of a thermostat, and a steam engine centrifugal governor. The rest of the chapter is mostly taken up with the development of a mathematical formulation of the operation of the principles underlying all of these processes. More complex systems are then discussed such as automated navigation, and the control of non-linear situations such as steering on an icy road. He concludes with a reference to the homeostatic processes in living organisms.

=== Computing Machines and the Nervous System ===
This chapter opens with a discussion of the relative merits of analog computers and digital computers (which Wiener referred to as analogy machines and numerical machines), and maintains that digital machines will be more accurate, electronic implementations will be superior to mechanical or electro-mechanical ones, and that the binary system is preferable to other numerical scales. After discussing the need to store both the data to be processed and the algorithms which are employed for processing that data, and the challenges involved in implementing a suitable memory system, he goes on to draw the parallels between binary digital computers and the nerve structures in organisms.

Among the mechanisms that he described for implementing a computer memory system was "a large array of small condensers which could be rapidly charged or discharged", called Williams tube, which had been invented in 1946.

Virtually all of the principles which Wiener enumerated as being desirable characteristics of calculating and data processing machines have been adopted in the design of digital computers, from the early mainframes of the 1950s to the latest microchips.

=== Gestalt and Universals ===
This brief chapter is a philosophical enquiry into the relationship between the physical events in the central nervous system and the subjective experiences of the individual. It concentrates principally on the processes whereby nervous signals from the retina are transformed into a representation of the visual field. It also explores the various feedback loops involved in the operation of the eyes: the homeostatic operation of the iris to control light levels, the adjustment of the lens to bring objects into focus, and the complex set of reflex movements to bring an object of attention into the detailed vision area of the fovea. The chapter concludes with an outline of the challenges presented by attempts to implement a reading machine for the blind.

=== Cybernetics and Psychopathology ===
Wiener opens this chapter with the disclaimers that he is neither a psychopathologist nor a psychiatrist, and that he is not asserting that mental problems are failings of the brain to operate as a computing machine. However, he suggests that there might be fruitful lines of enquiry opened by considering the parallels between the brain and a computer. (He employed the archaic-sounding phrase "computing machine", because at the time of writing the word "computer" referred to a person who is employed to perform routine calculations). He then discussed the concept of 'redundancy' in the sense of having two or three computing mechanisms operating simultaneously on the same problem, so that errors may be recognised and corrected.

=== Information, Language, and Society ===
Starting with an outline of the hierarchical nature of living organisms, and a discussion of the structure and organisation of colonies of symbiotic organisms, such as the Portuguese Man o' War, this chapter explores the parallels with the structure of human societies, and the challenges faced as they scale and complexity of society increases.

The chapter closes with speculation about the possibility of constructing a chess-playing machine, and concludes that it would be conceivable to build a machine capable of a standard of play better than most human players but not at expert level. Such a possibility seemed entirely fanciful to most commentators in the 1940s, bearing in mind the state of computing technology at the time, although events have turned out to vindicate the prediction – and even to exceed it.

=== On Learning and Self-Reproducing Machines ===
Starting with an examination of the learning process in organisms, Wiener expands the discussion to John von Neumann's theory of games, and the application to military situations. He then speculates about the manner in which a chess-playing computer could be programmed to analyse its past performances and improve its performance. This proceeds to a discussion of the evolution of conflict, as in the examples of matador and bull, or mongoose and cobra, or between opponents in a tennis game. He discusses various stories such as The Sorcerer's Apprentice, which illustrate the view that the literal-minded reliance on "magical" processes may turn out to be counter-productive or catastrophic. The context of this discussion was to draw attention to the need for caution in delegating to machines the responsibility for warfare strategy in an age of Nuclear weapons. The chapter concludes with a discussion of the possibility of self-replicating machines and the work of Professor Dennis Gabor in this area.

=== Brain Waves and Self-Organising Systems ===
This chapter opens with a discussion of the mechanism of evolution by natural selection, which he refers to as "phylogenetic learning", since it is driven by a feedback mechanism caused by the success or otherwise in surviving and reproducing; and modifications of behaviour over a lifetime in response to experience, which he calls "ontogenetic learning". He suggests that both processes involve non-linear feedback, and speculates that the learning process is correlated with changes in patterns of the rhythms of the waves of electrical activity that can be observed on an electroencephalograph. After a discussion of the technical limitations of earlier designs of such equipment, he suggests that the field will become more fruitful as more sensitive interfaces and higher performance amplifiers are developed and the readings are stored in digital form for numerical analysis, rather than recorded by pen galvanometers in real time - which was the only available technique at the time of writing. He then develops suggestions for a mathematical treatment of the waveforms by Fourier analysis, and draws a parallel with the processing of the results of the Michelson–Morley experiment which confirmed the constancy of the velocity of light, which in turn led Albert Einstein to develop the theory of Special Relativity. As with much of the other material in this book, these pointers have been both prophetic of future developments and suggestive of fruitful lines of research and enquiry.

== Influence ==
The book discussed and contributed to the research in electronic engineering, computing (both analog and digital), servomechanisms, automation, telecommunications and neuroscience. It also created widespread public debates on the technical, philosophical and sociological issues it discussed. And it inspired a wide range of books on various subjects peripherally related to its content.

The book introduced the word 'cybernetics' itself into public discourse.

Maxwell Maltz titled his pioneering self-development work "Psycho-Cybernetics" in reference to the process of steering oneself towards a pre-defined goal by making corrections to behaviour. Much of the personal development industry and the Human potential movement is said to be derived from Maltz's work.

Cybernetics became a surprise bestseller and was widely read beyond the technical audience that Wiener had expected. In response he wrote The Human Use of Human Beings in which he further explored the social and psychological implications in a format more suited to the non-technical reader.

In 1954, Marie Neurath produced a children's book Machines which seem to Think , which introduced the concepts of Cybernetics, control systems and negative feedback in an accessible format.

The text was translated into Chinese by Chen Bu (Chen Po), who is widely viewed as the founding father of the Chinese study of AI. The text, Wiener's works, and cybernetics more broadly were influential in early 1980s Chinese research on AI.
