= Boris Agapov =

Soviet writer (1899–1973)

Boris Nikolayevich Agapov (19 February [O.S. 7 February] 1899, Tbilisi – 6 October 1973, Moscow) was a Soviet poet, journalist and screenwriter. He is best known for a 1950 article on cybernetics which proved influential for the early reception of cybernetics in the Soviet Union.

== Biography ==
Agapov was born on 19 February [O.S. 7 February] 1899 and spent his childhood in Tbilisi, where he graduated from the Department of Philology at Tbilisi State University in 1922. Having been secretary of the Caucaus Bureau of the Russian Telegraph Agency from 1921–22, Agapov moved to Moscow in 1922 to continue his career as a journalist. Agapov began his career here as the member of the group of constructivist poets, the Literary Center of Constructivists, but soon moved on to less radical grounds. From the 1930s, the subjects of his works were mostly recent advances in Soviet science and Soviet construction works, though he also published articles on education and a travel journal. In 1950 he was the editor of the Soviet newspaper, Literaturnaya Gazeta. In 1967, Agapov summarised his view of art as "primarily a tool of communication".

One event in Agapov's career that has gathered much attention was the publication of an article on cybernetics in 1950. In the wake of the formation of NATO, Agitprop against American culture was ordered to be intensified, giving rise to a scramble among Soviet journalists to find more original ways to present anti-American views. On 4 May 1950, Agapov published "Mark III, a Calculator" in Literaturnaia gazeta. This article ridiculed the interest in computers and cybernetics in post-war America, mocking American capitalists who "love information as American patients love patented pills" singling out Norbert Wiener (the founding thinker of cybernetics) for his support of American capitalists' "sweet dream" of replacing workers with robots. He commented on a recent issue of Time (23 January 1950), depicting the Mark III dressed in American military clothing on its cover, as making it "immediately clear in whose service [it] is employed". This issue of Time was Agapov's only source in writing the article, having never read any of Wiener's actual work.

According to historian of science Slava Gerovitch, though it never mentioned cybernetics by name, this "article had a profound impact on the reception of cybernetics in the Soviet Union" and was "evidently taken as a 'signal' of the official negative attitude toward cybernetics", beginning a Soviet ideological campaign against cybernetics. It was not until the death of Stalin that the role of cybernetics would be reevaluated by Soviet scientists. Its significance has been questioned by scholar Valery Shilov, instead proposing Mikhail Yaroshevsky's 1952 article as the beginning of the campaign against Soviet cybernetics.

Agapov was also a writer of several Soviet documentaries. In 1946, Agapov feared disapproval from Stalin over his role (though minor) as one of the writers of the prohibited film, Great Life; this fear dissipated, as Valery Shilov mentions he became, evidently, a "man who could be trusted to fulfill important and responsible Party tasks". Agapov was twice the recipient of the USSR State Prize for his scripts for these documentaries: first in 1946 for The Renaissance of Stalingrad (1944), then in 1948 for The Day of the Conquering Country (1947).

Agapov died on 6 October 1973, in Moscow.

== Reception and legacy ==
The third edition of the Great Soviet Encyclopedia (1970–79) assessed Agapov favourably, citing him as "one of the pioneers of the Soviet industrial sketch genre", characterised by his "broad generalizations and a poetic treatment of science". Slavic studies scholar Wolfgang Kasack was less flattering, pithily summarising that "he wrote uninteresting stories devoted to the socialism building [...] [and] was [a] popularizer of actual events in economics and science".

== Bibliography ==
- Material for the Creation of the World (1933)
- The I.V. Stalin White Sea – Baltic Sea Canal (1934) (among others)
- Technical Stories (1936)
- Exploits of the Innovators (1950)
- Journey to Brussels (1959)
- About the Past, About Various Things, About the Future (The Great Polymers) (1960)

== Sources ==
- "Agapov, Boris Nikolaevich". The Great Soviet Encyclopedia (3rd ed.). 1979.
- Shilov, Valery (2014). Reefs of Myths: Towards the History of Cybernetics in the Soviet Union. 2014 Third International Conference on Computer Technology in Russia and in the Former Soviet Union. doi:10.1109/sorucom.2014.46. ISBN 978-1-4799-1799-0.
- Gerovitch, Slava (2002). From Newspeak to Cyberspeak: A History of Soviet Cybernetics. Cambridge, MA: The MIT Press. ISBN 9780262572255.
