= Leonid Kraizmer =

Soviet cybernetician

Leonid Pavlovich Kraizmer (Russian: Леонид Павлович Крайзмер) (29 May, 1912 – 2002) was leading Soviet cybernetician who was active in Leningrad before moving to Akademgorodok, Novosibirsk, Russia.

== Publications in English ==
- Bionics (1963) U.S. Dept. of Commerce, Office of Technical Services, Joint Publications Research Service
- Technical Cybernetics (1967) translation of Tekhnicheskaia kibernetika (1958) Moscow: Energiia Moskva
- High Speed Ferromagnetic Memory Units (1967)
