= Sergey Yablonsky =

Soviet and Russian mathematician

Sergey Vsevolodovich Yablonsky
- Sergey Yablonsky
- Born: 6 December 1924; Moscow, Russia
- Died: 26 May 1998 (aged 73); Moscow, Russia
- Education: Moscow State University
- Awards: Lenin Prize
- Scientific career
- Fields: Mathematics and discrete mathematics
- Workplaces: Moscow State University Steklov Institute of Mathematics Institute of Applied Mathematics
- Doctoral advisor: Nina Bari; Pyotr Novikov
- Doctoral students: Oleg Lupanov, Rafail Krichevskii

Sergey Vsevolodovich Yablonsky (Russian: Серге́й Все́володович Ябло́нский, 6 December 1924 – 26 May 1998) was a Soviet and Russian mathematician, one of the founders of the Soviet school of mathematical cybernetics and discrete mathematics. He is the author of a number of classic results on synthesis, reliability, and classification of control systems (Russian: Управляющие системы), the term used in the USSR and Russia for a generalization of finite-state automata, Boolean circuits and multi-valued logic circuits.

Yablonsky is credited for helping to overcome the pressure from Soviet ideologists against the term and the discipline of cybernetics and establishing what in the Soviet Union was called mathematical cybernetics as a separate field of mathematics. Yablonsky and his students were ones of the first in the world to raise the issues of potentially inherent unavoidability of the brute force search for some problems, the precursor of the P = NP problem, though Gödel's letter to von Neumann, dated 20 March 1956 and discovered in 1988, may have preceded them.

In Russia, a group led by Yablonsky had the idea that combinatorial problems are hard in proportion to the amount of brute-force search required to find a solution. In particular, they noticed that for many problems they could not find a useful way to organize the space of potential solutions so as to avoid brute force search. They began to suspect that these problems had an inherently unorganized solution space, and the best method for solving them would require enumerating an exponential (in the size of the problem instance) number of potential solutions. That is, the problems seem to require $c^n$ "shots in the dark" (for some constant $c$) when the length of the problem description is $n$. However, despite their "leading-edge" taste in mathematics, Yablonsky's group never quite formulated this idea precisely.

== Biography ==
=== Childhood ===
Sergey Yablonsky

Yablonsky was born in Moscow, to the family of a professor of mechanics. His mathematical talents became apparent in early age. In 1940 he became the winner of the sixth Moscow secondary school mathematical olympiad.

=== War ===
In August 1942, after completing his first year at Moscow State University's Faculty of Mechanics and Mathematics, Yablonsky, then 17, went to serve in the Soviet Army, fighting in the second world war as a member of the tank brigade 242. For his service he was awarded two Orders of the Patriotic War, two Orders of the Red Star, Order of Glory of the 3rd class, and numerous medals. He returned to his study after the war has ended in 1945 and went on to graduate with distinction.

=== Post-war period ===
Yablonsky graduated the Faculty of Mechanics and Mathematics of Moscow State University in 1950. During his student years he worked under supervision of Nina Bari. This collaboration resulted in his first research paper, "On the converging sequences of continuous functions" (1950).

He joined the graduate program of the Faculty of Mechanics and Mathematics in 1950 where his advisor was Pyotr Novikov. There Yablonsky's research was on the issues of the expressibility in mathematical logic. He approached this problem in terms of the theory of k-valued discrete functions. Among the problems that were addressed in his PhD thesis titled "Issues of functional completeness in k-valued calculus" (1953) is the definitive answer to the question of completeness in 3-valued logic.

Starting from 1953, Yablonsky worked at the Department of Applied Mathematics of Steklov Institute of Mathematics, that in 1966 became the separate Institute of Applied Mathematics. Over the period of the 1950s and 1960s, together with Alexey Lyapunov, Yablonsky organized the seminar on cybernetics, showing his support to the new field of mathematics that had been a subject of a significant controversy fueled by Soviet ideologists. He actively participated in the creation of the periodical publication Problems of Cybernetics, with Lyapunov as its first editor-in-chief. Yablonsky succeeded Lyapunov as the editor-in-chief of Problems of Cybernetics in 1974 (the publication changed its name to Mathematical Issues of Cybernetics in 1989). In 1966 Yablonsky (together with Yuri Zhuravlyov and Oleg Lupanov) was awarded Lenin Prize for their work on the theory of control systems (in the discrete-mathematical sense, as explained above). In 1968 Yablonsky was elected a corresponding member of the Academy of Sciences of the Soviet Union (division of mathematics).

Yablonsky played an active role in the creation of the Faculty of Computational Mathematics and Cybernetics at Moscow State University in 1970. In 1971 he became the founding head of the department of mathematical cybernetics (initially department of automata theory and mathematical logic) at the Faculty of Computational Mathematics and Cybernetics.
