= Anatoly Kitov =

Soviet military analyst, engineer, mathematician and information scientist

- Анатолий Иванович Китов
- Born: 9 August 1920; Samara, Russian SFSR, USSR
- Died: 14 October 2005 (aged 85); Moscow, Russia
- Education: Dzerzhinsky Artillery Academy (1950)
- Occupations: military officer; scientist; engineer
- Employer: Plekhanov Russian University of Economics
- Known for: a pioneer of cybernetics in the Soviet Union
- Title: Doctor of Engineering; Professor
- Children: 1
- Website: www.kitov-anatoly.ru (in Russian)

Signature
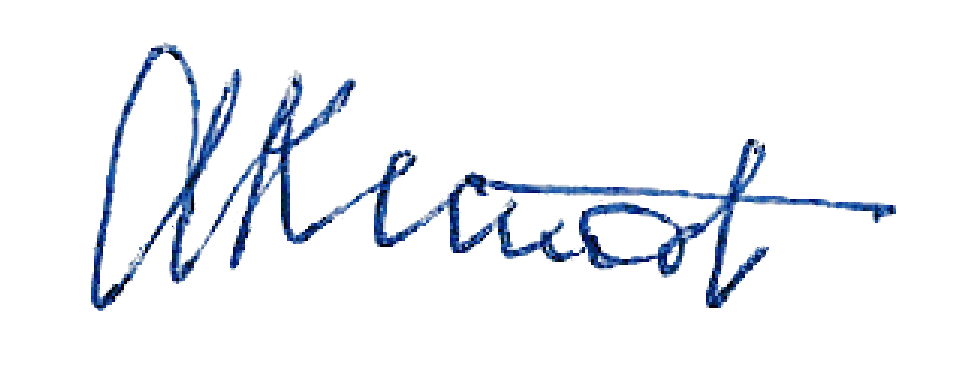

Anatoly Ivanovich Kitov (9 August 1920 – 14 October 2005) was a pioneer of cybernetics in the Soviet Union.

== Early life and education ==
Anatoly Kitov was born in Samara in 1920. The Kitov family moved to Tashkent in 1921, as Anatoly's father, Ivan Stepanovich Kitov, had served as a junior officer in the White Army and wanted to avoid the repercussions of the Russian Civil War. Anatoly excelled at secondary school and graduated in 1939. However, his enrollment at Tashkent State University was interrupted when he was called up for military service.

While serving in the Red Army, his exceptional abilities caught the attention of Kliment Voroshilov, who ordered him to enlist in the High Artillery School in Leningrad. In June 1941, Kitov and his fellow students had to halt their studies and were urgently deployed to the front. Kitov was already a lieutenant at that time.

During lulls between battles, Kitov pursued his studies in mathematics and other university subjects. In 1943, at the age of 22, he conducted his first analytical work, proposing a new method of anti-aircraft shooting.

In August 1945, Kitov gained admission to the rocket armaments department of the Dzerzhinsky Artillery Academy, a prestigious military university in the USSR. He skipped the first academic year and joined in the second. Kitov took an active role as chairman of the academy's student scientific society. Throughout his studies, he worked on the development of a novel rocket weapon and received an "author's certificate on the invention" (patent) from the USSR State Committee on Inventions. His project proposal was later presented to Joseph Stalin, the Red Army supreme commander and General Secretary of the Communist Party. Kitov also contributed to the efforts of Sergei Korolev's task force, which was engaged in the development of the Soviet R-1 missile.

In 1950, Kitov graduated from the academy with honors and received a gold medal.

== Early research career ==
Kitov was the first user of the first Soviet serial computer "Strela" within the Military Ministry of the USSR. Kitov was the first in the USSR to organise and lead scientific work on solving military problems with the use of electronic computers. Previously, these duties were calculations for a variety of mathematical bureaus within the General Staff of the USSR armed forces, for the Main Intelligence Directorate, for the Main Directorate of the Land Forces, and for the Directorate of Support, among others.

By the mid-1950s, Kitov developed his main principles of computer-based automated military-control and management systems for defence purposes. Between 1953 and 1963, Kitov issued the Soviet Union's first series of scientific journal articles on military informatics. They were published in the journals Military Thought, Radioelectronics, News of the F.E. Dzerzhinsky Artillery Academy, and periodical collections of works at the USSR Ministry of Defence, and other "special" (classified) sources.

=== First computer department in the USSR ===
In 1952, Kitov founded and headed the first Soviet "Department of Computers" at the Artillery Academy. At that time, it was called the "Department of Mathematical Machines". Also in 1952, Kitov wrote his dissertation titled "Programming of the outer ballistics problems for the long-range missiles".

In 1953, Kitov published a 30-page scientific article, "Implementation and usage of electronic computers".

In May 1954, when he was 33, Kitov founded the first computer centre in the USSR, the Computer Centre No. 1 (CC No. 1) of the Ministry of Defense (secret number 01168).

=== Creation of the USSR anti-missile defense system ===
Ballistic calculations for strategic rocket forces and for the first spaceflights took special priority in the CC No. 1's work. A description of the architecture of the highly advanced "M-100" computer became a part of Kitov's thesis for his second doctoral degree. The dissertation was titled "Implementation of Computers for solving the Problems of Antiaircraft and Antimissile Defence". He defended it in 1963 at the closed (for authorised persons only) meeting of the Scientific Council of the Institute of Management Problems. Besides the "M-100" Kitov also analysed principles of designing specialised military computers. He defined specific features of their structure, invented algorithmic programming languages for solving complex anti-air defence problems with the use of computers, and performed computer modelling of dynamical systems connected with air defence systems demands.

=== New computer development ===
At the CC No. 1, Kitov headed and participated in the design and manufacturing of two new computers: "M-100" and "Udar" ("blow"). Both were successfully put into operation. The M-100 processed data from surveillance radar stations. Udar was used to prepare ballistic missiles for launch.

For the principle of parallel processing of instructions, the author's certificate for invention was given to Kitov with his three colleagues on 27 June 1958. Kitov proposed to implement this principle at the CC No. 1, where it was used for the M-100, which was developed under Kitov's guidance. It was the fastest computer in the world, at one hundred thousand instructions per second. In the M-100 some of the world's first immediate access stores on ferrite cores were used. The M-100's two-level addressing of caches was an important factor in increasing its performance. Other major innovations were classified, as the whole project was secret. Kitov established a special department of mathematics for designing the M-100 computer.

=== Writing on programming, computers and their applications ===
Kitov was the author of the first Soviet book (1956) and textbook (1959) on programming, computers, and their applications. Kitov published 12 books translated into nine foreign languages.

== Advances in cybernetics ==
=== Cybernetics science in the USSR ===
From 1948 to 1955, cybernetics was officially called bourgeois pseudoscience in the USSR. From 1951 to 1952, Kitov read the book Cybernetics: Or Control and Communication in the Animal and the Machine by Norbert Wiener in English. He found this book in the library of the secret base SKB-245. Kitov not only realized the scientific and social value of cybernetics, but also co-wrote the first positive article of the subject in the USSR, "The Main Features of Cybernetics", notable for its academic boldness in the repressive Stalin era. Thus, Kitov began the struggle for the recognition of cybernetics in the USSR.

From 1953 to 1954, Kitov lectured on cybernetics in well-known Soviet organizations. Kitov invited the mathematicians Sergei Sobolev and Alexey Lyapunov to become co-authors of his article "The Main Features of Cybernetics". The article was published in the journal Voprosy Filosofii (1955, No. 4) and for the first time presented the principles of cybernetics to Soviet audiences. The victory for cybernetics was bolstered by the publication two months later of Kitov's article "Technical Cybernetics" in the popular technical monthly Radio. From 1955 to 1961, the scientific works of Kitov played a significant role in the recognition of cybernetics as a science and in its development in the USSR and other socialist countries.

In his first book Digital Electronic Machines (1956), Kitov described what he called "non-arithmetic usage of computers". Large sections of the book were dedicated to usage of computers in economic planning, automation of production processes, and solving other intellectual problems. In his next book, Electronic Computing Machines (1958), Kitov describes in detail some perspectives of complex automation in management, including managing industrial production and solving economic problems.

Kitov was the creator of the idea of automated management systems in the Soviet Union. In his paper "Programming information and logic tasks" (1967), Kitov presented "associative programming" technology, a method for solving logical problems with large data array processing. The programming language ALGEM, created with Kitov's guidance, was described. ALGEM was used in the USSR and in the socialist countries of Eastern Europe.

In his next book "Programming of economical and management tasks", Kitov generalised his experiences as the chief designer of the automated management system (AMS) for the Ministry of Radio-Industry. That system was recognised as the basic model for AMSes for the other nine Ministries of the USSR weapons industry. The book presented basic principles of creation automated management systems for plants and industry.

=== Computer networking for national economic planning ===
Clear understanding of the importance of AMS development led Kitov, at the end of 1958, to conclude the need for automated management of the national economy and armed forces, on the basis of full-scale usage of electronic computers and mathematical methods. The main point was that this AMS should be based on a national network of regional computer centres (project "Red Book"). Kitov is famous in the former Soviet Union for being the first cyberneticist in the world to suggest a global integrated computer network for automated management of both the USSR's national economy and the armed forces.

Kitov proposed that the technological structure of that system would be a global, double purpose, computer network, covering the whole of the USSR's territory, anticipating OGAS and the Internet. This network should consist of hundreds of computer centres maintained by specially qualified military personnel. In the autumn of 1959, Kitov sent his second letter on his project of global computer network (project "Red Book") to the new General Secretary, Nikita Khrushchev.

=== Information retrieval systems ===
A typical example of Kitov's scientific intuition was his opinion on information retrieval systems. Kitov initiated scientific works at the CC No. 1 on computational linguistics and machine translation. Kitov proposed to concentrate the centre's initial basic efforts not on direct increases in performance, but on the development of methods, algorithms, and programs which permitted extending processing, storage, and retrieval semantic information.

=== Theory and practice of algorithmic programming languages ===
Kitov was the creator of two algorithmic programming languages: ALGEM and NORMIN. Compared with ALGOL-60, ALGEM was completed with new types of data, which made possible processing of not only numerical but also text-based information and data groups of various types.

For a long time, ALGEM was a "workhorse" for Soviet programmers working with non-arithmetical applications of computers. ALGEM was also used in numerous automated management systems of various levels, implemented in industry and administrative management structures, both in the USSR and in other socialist countries.

In the 1970s, while working as the chief designer of the AMS 'Healthcare', Kitov developed an algorithmic programming language known as NORMIN, which was widely used in the USSR for medical diagnostics. NORMIN was the first Soviet query language for information retrieval on formalised natural language. Taking under consideration that medical AMS would be used by the public, who did not have special technical education, Kitov implemented a special interface in his systems, which was convenient and intuitive as much as was possible at the level of computer development of that time. The interface realised, among others, a dialogue mode called "human-computer" in the normalised natural language NORMIN, and served as a testbed for usability testing techniques.

=== Computer unification and standardisation ===
In his 1 July 1959 letter to Khrushchev, Kitov insisted that the introduction of automated systems in the country should be conducted under the supervision of state administrators at high levels – such as the members of the Soviet Politburo. Kitov proposed that all work in the field of computing research and automated management systems be subjected to a single state body which would be granted a monopoly to coordinate, control, and implement all developments and achievements of that branch. "Only such organisation will grant successful progress, rational, without time-delays or senseless chaotic actions", he wrote.

In his article "Computers – Assistants in each Thing" from 12 July 1960, Kitov declared that: "Taking under consideration exceptional importance of the computer development for the national economy and for the state defence, and also considering the fact that production of these computation means is steadily increasing, the need for centralised control over the work of computation centres of all kinds and categories and in control and coordination of usage of single computers, belonging to various organisations, is getting clear. These measures will enable the most rational usage of computers in interests of the whole country."

Kitov wanted the system to perform on the national scale, and wrote about it in many of his articles. Unfortunately for him, his ideas and proposals went unheard and the bureaucratic machine was too slow.

== Medical cybernetics ==
By the 1970s, Kitov had worked in healthcare for more than ten years. He became a world leader in medical cybernetics, overseeing the development of the information model of the Soviet medical industry; unified software packages for forming and logical control of information arrays were worked out. Within the health care field he established scientific schools of thought, educated a number of talented followers, and guided many dissertation works. Kitov also published several conceptual articles and three monographs: "Automation of Information processing and Management in the Healthcare Field" (1976); "Introduction into Medical Cybernetics" (1977); and "Medical Cybernetics" (1983).

Kitov made great contributions to the creation of "local" medical AMSes, which functioned within specific enterprises: at hospitals, clinics, and drugstores. The first AMS of that type operated at the clinical hospital No. 6, subject to the Third Directorate of the USSR Ministry of Health. Later this AMS supported the curing and rehabilitation of victims of the 1986 Chernobyl disaster.

For 12 years, Kitov was the national representative of the USSR in the field of medical informatics at the United Nations and UNESCO, serving in top-level positions at the International Federation of Medical Informatics (MedInfo), the International Medical Informatics Association, and Technical Committee No. 4 of the International Federation for Information Processing (TC-4 IFIP).

Kitov participated in the organization of three international congresses of MedInfo: the first World Congress of MedINFO (1974, Stockholm), the second World Congress (1977, Toronto), and the third World Congress (1980, Tokyo). About a thousand scientists from developed countries gathered at the second World Congress. Kitov also chaired the section on biomedical research.

== Academic career ==
Between 1951 to 1952, Kitov conducted one a course on computers and programming at the Dzerzhinsky Artillery Academy. More than 40 postgraduates, both Soviet and foreign, prepared and defended dissertations under Kitov's scientific supervision. In 1980, he accepted a position at the Plekhanov Russian University of Economics, where he worked for seventeen years, as chair of the Computer Programming department.

== Bibliography ==
- Kitov A.I. Candidate dissertation (PhD thesis). "Programming of exterior ballistics for long-range rockets". Scientific Research Institute (SRI) – 4 USSR Ministry of Defence (MD USSR), 1952. P. 280.
- Kitov A.I. Application of Electronic Computers // News of F.E. Dzerzhinsky Academy, 1953. P. 30.
- Sobolev S.L., Kitov A.I., Lyapunov A.A. Main Traits of Cybernetics // "Problems of Philosophy". 1955. No 4. P. 136–148.
- Kitov A.I. Technical cybernetics // "Radio". 1955. No 11. P. 42–44.
- Kitov A.I. Electronic Digital Computers. М.: "Sovetskoe Radio", 1956. P. 358.
- Kitov A.I. Significance of electronic computers for military field // "Radioelektronika". 1956. No 12. P.
- Kitov A.I. Electronic computers and their military applications // "Voennaya mysl" (military thought). 1956. No 7. P. 25–35.
- Kitov A.I. Electronic Computers // Radio-engineering and electronics and their technical applications // Under editorship of academician A.I. Berg and prof. I.S. Dzhigit М.: published by the USSR Academy of Sciences (AS USSR), 1956. P. 106–114.
- Kitov A.I., Krinitsky N.A., Komolov P.N. Elements of programming (for digital electronic computers) / Under edition of A.I. Kitov. М.: published by the F.E. Dzerzhinsky Artillery Academy, 1956. P. 288.
- Kitov A.I. Mathematics in military field // "Voennaya mysl". 1958. No 6. P. 3–16.
- Kitov A.I. Electronic computers. М.: "Znanie". 1958. P. 31.
- Kitov A.I., Krinitsky N.A. Electronic computers. М.: "Nauka" (Science), 1958. P. 130; second – revised and enlarged – edition. М.: "Nauka", 1965. P. 176.
- Kitov A.I., Krinitsky N.A. Electronic computers. М.: "Nauka" (Science), 1958. P. 130; 2nd – revised and enlarged – edition. М.: "Nauka", 1965. P. 176.
- Kitov A.I., Mylnikov M.V. Shuvalov A.I., Seleznev O.V. Author's Certificate on special subject No 19628 from 6 May 1959. The State Committee of the USSR Council of Ministers on Inventions and Discoveries.
- Kitov A.I. Computing – assistant in each activity // Daily "Izvestia". 12 July 1960. P. 4
- Kitov A.I. Cybernetics and management of the national economy // "Cybernetics – to serve communism" (scientific-popular series) Collection of works under edition of academician A.I. Berg. Vol. 1. М.- L.: "Gosenergoizdat", 1961. P. 203–218.
- Kitov A.I. Cybernetics in national economy management // Daily paper "Ekonomicheskaya gazeta". 28 August 1961. No 4. P. 9–11.
- Kitov A., Krinitskii N. Electronic computers. Oxford, London, New York, Paris: Pergamon Press, 1962. viii+112 p. (International Series of Monographs on Electronics and Instrumentation. Vol. 13.
- Kitov A.I. Cybernetics // Encyclopaedic dictionary of physics. Edition in five volumes. Vol. 2. М.: "Sovetskaya Encyclopedia", 1962. P. 357–362.
- Berg A.I., Kitov A.I., Lyapunov A.A. On the Possibilities of the Automation of Control in the National Economy // Soviet Computer Technology. Problems in Cybernetics. vol. 6. Translated from the Russian by Wade Holland. RAND Corporation. Memorandum RM-2919/17-PR. February 1963. P. 83–100.
- Kitov A.I. Cybernetics // Production automation and industrial electronics. Vol. 2. М.: "Sovetskaya Entsiclopedia". 1963. P. 24–36
- Kitov A.I. Programming of information-logical problems. М.: "Sovetskoe Radio", 1967. P. 327.
- Kitov A.I. Programming of economic and management problems. М.: "Sovetskoe Radio", 1971. P. 370.
- Kitov A.I. Fundamental principles of designing information retrieval systems for medical field // Digital computers and programming. Issue 6. М.: "*Radio", 1971. P. 17–31.
- Kitov A.I. ALGEM // Encyclopaedia of Cybernetics. Vol. 1. Kiev: "Ukrainian Soviet Encyclopaedia", 1974. P. 108
- Vorobyov E.I., Kitov A.I. Automation of management and information processing in healthcare. М.: "Sovetskoe Radio", 1976. P. 134.
- Kitov A.I. Fundamental principles of composing documental-factographic information-retrieval system // Algorithms and organisation of economic problems solution. Issue 7. М.: "Statistika", 1976. P. 14–25.
- Vorobyov E.I., Kitov A.I. Introduction in medical cybernetics. М.: "Meditsina", 1977. P. 288.
- Kitov A.I., Budko N.N. Normalize language of medical information "NORMIN" // Problems of Informational Theory and Practice. No 33. М.: (ВИНИТИ / VINITI), 1978. P. 64–77.
- Vorobyov E.I., Kitov A.I. Medical cybernetics. М.: "Radio I Svyaz’", 1983. P. 240.
- Kitov A.I. Problems of automated management systems creation for national economy // Collection of reports. (МДНТП). М., 1967. P. 16.
- Kitov A.I. (Chief designer of the AMS), Glushkov V.M. (Scientific supervisor of the AMS). Pilot project of standard automated informati on-management system for industry branch. M.: Ministry of Radio-Industry USSR, 1967. P. 150.
- Kitov A.I. (Scientific supervisor). User’s manual on the system of economic-mathematical problems programming automation ALGEM-ST-2. М.: USSR (MRI) and USSR (CSD), 1968. 9 p.
- Kitov A.I. Automated information-management system for industry branch// Collection of works of the State Committee on Science and Engineering (SCSE). М.: (SCSE), 1970. P. 24
- Kitov A.I. (Chief designer). Technical and operation projects AMS «Healthcare». М.: The 3rd Main Directorate of the USSR Ministry of Healthcare, 1975. P. 100.
- Kitov A.I. Computers, Informatics and Biomedical research // Proceedings of the 2nd International Conference on medical Informatics «MEDINFO – 77», Toronto, 1977.
- Kitov A.I. (Chief designer). Technical project of AMS for the 3rd Main Directorate of the USSR Ministry of Healthcare. The 3rd Main Directorate of the USSR Ministry of Healthcare // Institute of Biophysics, 1978. P. 80.

== See also ==
- OGAS
- Project Cybersyn
- Cyberocracy
- Cybernetics in the Soviet Union
- List of Internet pioneers
- Stafford Beer
- Alexey Lyapunov
