= Rafail Krichevskii =

Russian mathematician (1936–2025)

- Рафаил Евсеевич Кричевский
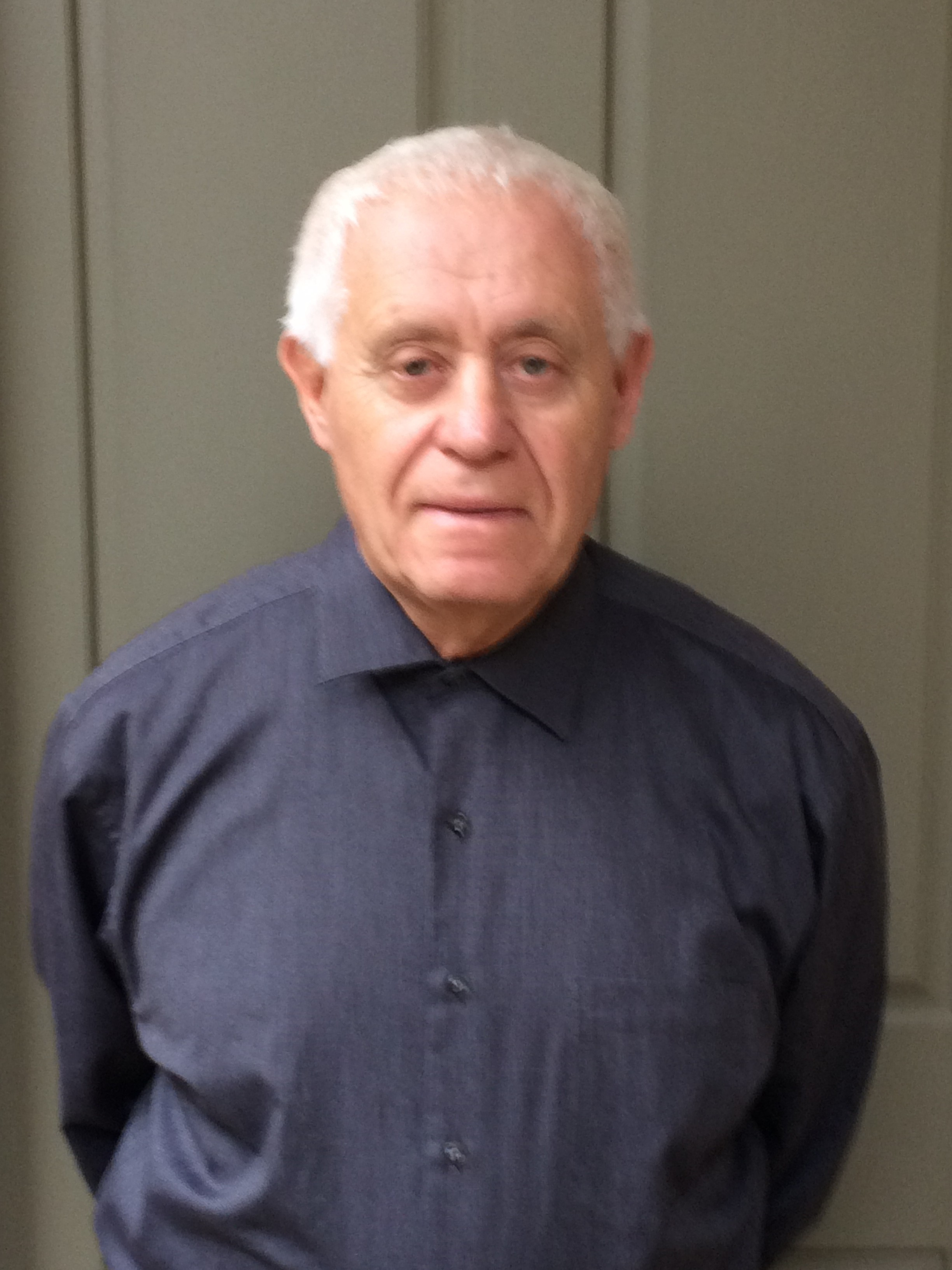
- Born: 12 October 1936; Kharkov, Ukraine
- Died: 27 November 2025 (aged 89); Laguna Woods, California, U.S.
- Education: Moscow State University
- Scientific career
- Fields: information theory, computer science
- Workplaces: Sobolev Institute of Mathematics, University of California, Riverside
- Doctoral advisor: Sergey Yablonsky

Rafail Evseevich Krichevskii (Рафаил Евсеевич Кричевский, sometimes transliterated as "Krichevskiy" or "Krichevsky", 12 October 1936 – 27 November 2025) was a Russian mathematician and information theorist. He had lived in the United States since 1996.

He graduated from Moscow State University in 1958. He received his PhD degree in Theoretical Cybernetics in 1963. His PhD advisor was Sergey Yablonsky. Further, Krichevskii became a Doctor of Physical and mathematical sciences (1988) and professor (1991), specializing in the field of mathematical cybernetics and information theory. From 1962 to 1996, he worked at the Sobolev Institute of Mathematics. In the late 90s, he worked in University of California, Riverside, US.

His main publications are in the fields of universal source coding, optimal hashing, combinatorial retrieval and error-correcting codes.

Krichevsky–Trofimov estimator is widely used in source coding and bioinformatics.

He supervised five doctoral (Russian candidate degree) students and two higher doctoral (habilitation) students. He was the author of about 80 scientific papers.

In 1986, Krichevskii was an Invited Speaker with talk Retrieval and data compression complexity at the ICM in Berkeley, California.

Krichevskii died on 27 November 2025, at the age of 89.

== Selected publications ==
- With V.K.Trofimov: "The Performance of Universal Encoding." IEEE Trans. Inform. Theory, V.27:2, (1981) 199–207. doi:10.1109/TIT.1981.1056331
- With B. Ya Ryabko and A. Yu Haritonov: "Optimal key for taxons ordered in accordance with their frequencies." Discrete Applied Mathematics 3, no. 1 (1981): 67–72. doi:10.1016/0166-218X(81)90029-9
- "Optimal hashing." Information and Control, V. 62:1, (1984) 64–92. doi:10.1016/S0019-9958(84)80010-8
- "Laplace's law of succession and universal encoding." IEEE Trans. Inform. Theory, V. 44:1, (1998) 296–303. doi:10.1109/18.651051
- "Universal Compression and Retrieval." Kluwer Academic Publishers (1994), 219 p.https://www.springer.com/br/book/9780792326724
