= The I.V. Stalin White Sea – Baltic Sea Canal =

Monograph by 36 Soviet writers

The White Sea Canal
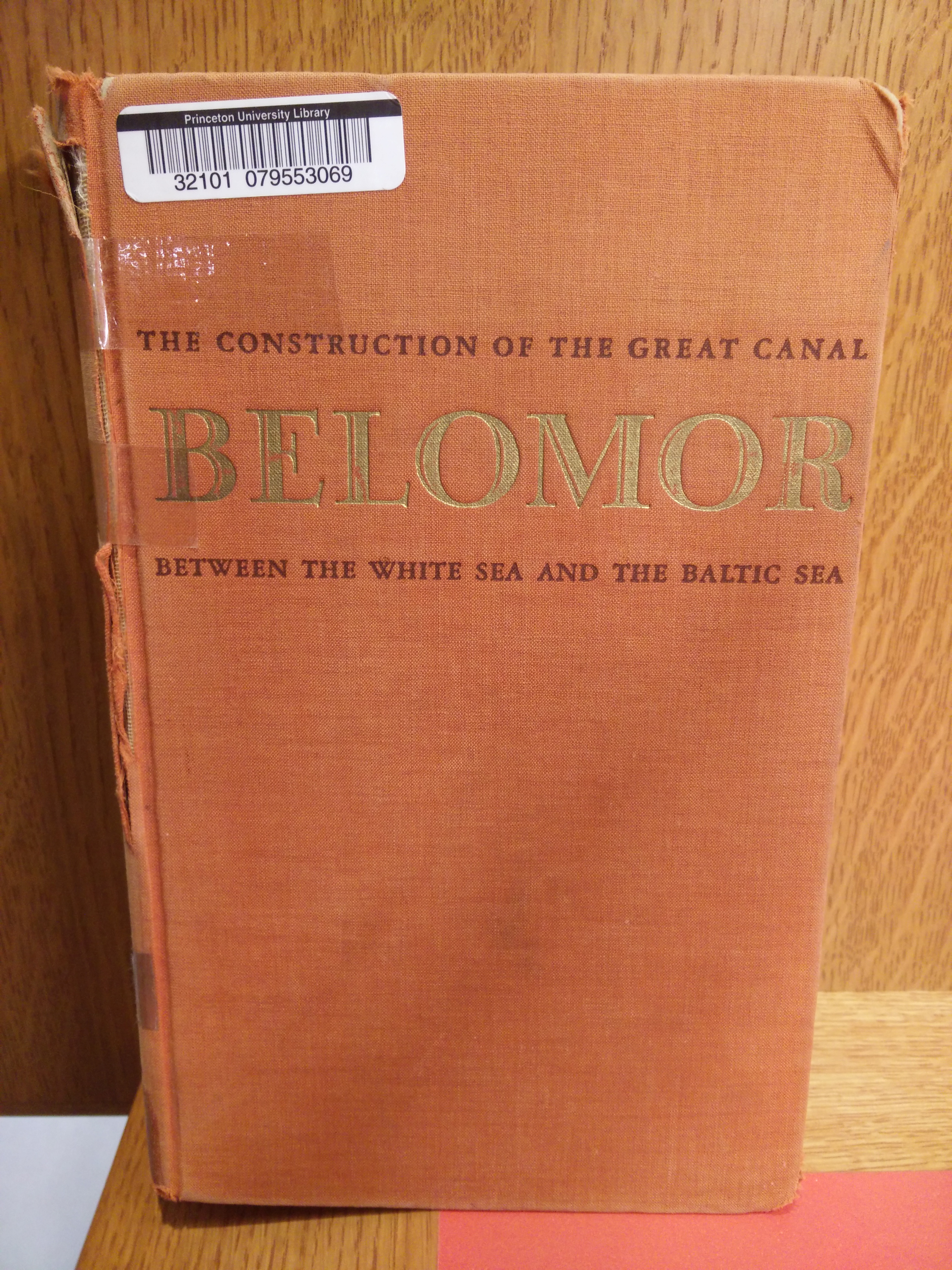
- Cover of the American Edition (1935)
- Editor: Maxim Gorky
- Language: Russian
- Genre: Documentary Book
- Published: January 20, 1934
- Publication place: Russia
- Media type: Print

The I.V. Stalin White Sea – Baltic Sea Canal (Russian: Беломорско - Балтийский канал имени Сталина: История строительства, 1931 - 1934 гг. (Stalin's White Sea - Baltic Kanal: History of Construction 1931 - 1934)) is a 1934 Soviet historical volume detailing the construction of the White Sea-Baltic Sea Canal and the labor used to construct it. The volume was edited and compiled by Maxim Gorky and contributed to by various other Soviet writers. In 1935, the work was translated from Russian into English and subsequently published in England as The White Sea Canal and in the United States as Belomor: An Account of the Construction of the Great Canal Between the White Sea and the Baltic Sea. The original version of the work consists of thirty-five chapters covering both the history of the canal's construction and personal narratives of the inmates who lived and worked in the labor camps. Together, these accounts were intended to show the power and ability of the state in reforming landscape and people according to its goals.

== History ==
In August 1933, the publishing house History of Factories and Industrial Enterprises editorial board decided to commission a book on the construction of the White Sea – Baltic Sea Canal. Under the guidance and control of the Joint State Political Directorate (OGPU), the publishing house assembled a “Writers' Brigade” of 120 writers from across the Soviet Union who met in Moscow on August 17, 1933 for a pre-trip orientation where the head of the Belomor prison camp provided background information on the project. Maxim Gorky, though not a participant in the August orientation or tour of the construction site, was chosen as the head editor and leader of the writers' brigade.

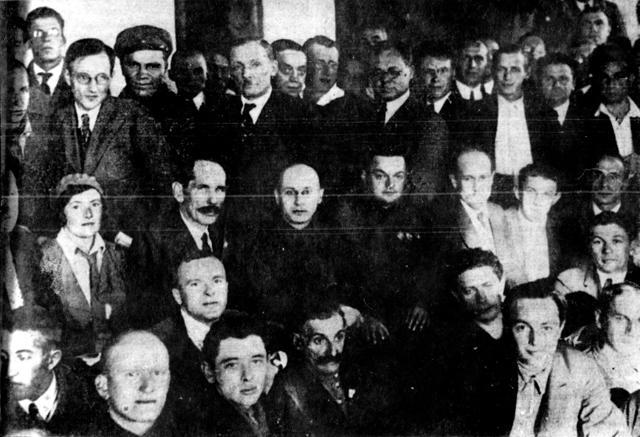
Members of the Writers' Brigade touring the White Sea Canal, 1933

Sailing from Leningrad, the writers began their weeklong tour toured the Canal zone later that month. Along the way, the writers were intended to have meetings with the “canalarmyists” (Russian: Kanaloarmeitsy from kanal, canal, and armeets, one who is part of the army) where they could interview the inmates and gain direct insight into the reformative aspects of the labor camp. However, most of the writers’ meetings were staged or tightly monitored and their observations were mostly done from afar. When writers did meet inmates, they were generally common criminals rather than political prisoners, who would have provided more critical views of the canal's labor methods. An additional limitation in the writers’ method of collecting information presented itself in the interviews with engineers which were performed through questionnaires delivered weeks to months after the trip itself rather than in person.

In September, the writers organized a plan for the writing of the book and divided the work amongst themselves. Throughout October, the authors met and discussed the manuscript and potential edits to it. A series of “Authors’ Notes” were created as readers read each other's draft manuscripts of chapters and recorded their comments and reactions. These comments ranged from general chapter summaries and reactions to specific revisions and suggestions for particular phrasings. In November, the manuscript began to be illustrated by a group of artists working under A. Tikhonov. In December the manuscript was passed to the printers and on January 20, 1934, the book was published in Russia, in time for the Seventeenth Party Congress. An English translation of the work was prepared in Moscow and proofed by May O’Callaghan before being published in England and the United States in 1935.

== Content ==
The original Russian version of the text was divided into fifteen chapters. In addition to these chapters, the volume includes a bibliography of works consulted and used during the creation of the text. These include government decrees, State Political Directorate (GPU) orders, camp bulletins and newspapers, and archival materials. The volumes also included maps of the canal and the greater waterway, which highlighted the Soviet's ability to transform and reshape landscapes.

Of the fifteen chapters, thirteen were written collectively while three are attributed to a single author. The chapters touch on a variety of topics from the longer history of efforts to connect the Baltic Sea and White Sea, to construction methods, to the long-term impact of the project. However, most sections relate the personal histories of camp laborers and emphasize the role of physical labor in reforming them from criminals to productive members of society.

Although The I.V. Stalin White Sea - Baltic Sea Canal was written after the completion of the canal's construction, references to the physical labor on the canal are frequently made in the future tense. This serves to locate the project in a distinct, imaginary temporal realm that was unconstrained by time limitations. Indeed, the new understanding of time extended to the ”five in four” slogan which proudly emphasized that projects within Stalin's Five-Year plan could be completed in four years.

== Process ==
Our writers must tell about all this. For facts appear first and are then followed by their artistic reflections.

— Maxim Gorky in 1933

The various authors of The I.V. Stalin White Sea - Baltic Sea Canal attempted to write from a universal rather individual point-of-view. The thirty-four authors “helped one another, corrected one another” and, because of the collaborative nature of their method, “it is difficult to indicate just who wrote the various sections.” The volume attracted attention from those that were curious about the process of group composition and how a group of such authors might go about choosing a subject to which that method was suitable. Beyond offering symbolic reinforcement of collective efforts, group composition offered elements of collective responsibility and collective protection to the creation of narratives. The method of group composition also resembled the technique of montage, which was widely popular during this period in Soviet photography and film. In montage, disparate elements are joined to create a unified whole such that individual qualities are secondary to a single idea. In The I.V. Stalin White Sea - Baltic Sea Canal, collective labor by disparate writers came together to create a work advancing the message of reforging Soviet society.

Gorky emphasized the importance of writers knowing and experiencing the Soviet Union's development prior to writing about it. Following that method, the authors of The I.V. Stalin White Sea - Baltic Sea Canal visited the canal zone to experience the reality of its construction. Although the reality they saw was manipulated, once on the site they could gather the raw materials related to the industrialization project and use that first-hand knowledge to document and create a history. Within that history, Gorky placed greater emphasis on the social and cultural consequences of the canal project rather than its economic motivation. Thus, the volume highlights the personal narratives of prison inmates and tracks the pedagogical elements of the labor camps.

== Controversy ==
The I.V. Stalin White Sea - Baltic Sea Canal was written as an official history of the canal project and attempted to document both the project history and personal histories of the workers building it. Because it was written with the intention of being an official record, the government officials guiding the writers’ research excursion meticulously planned and controlled the trip, placing limits on writers’ access to inmates and sources. Because of this, the book has often been criticized for its propagandist nature and for not revealing the reality of the forced labor project.

For example, despite the many similarities in harsh labor conditions and high fatality rates during the Canal construction and a Tsarist-era boat conduit project, The I.V. Stalin White Sea - Baltic Sea Canal presents the Canal construction a supposedly modern, humane approach to earlier project, though both were colloquially referred to as “road of bones." This criticism has alternatively been placed on those who organized the excursion and project, for creating half-truths that were accepted by the writers as evidence of the positive aspects of the construction, and on the writers themselves, who have been condemned for compromising the truth in exchange for benefits to their own careers or personal connections.

== Legacy ==
The Russian publication of The I.V. Stalin White Sea - Baltic Sea Canal occurred in three printings. The first run of 4,000 copies in January 1934 was intended for the delegates of the Seventeenth Party Congress which was meeting that month. That Congress dictated the timeline of the project and was the reason it was pushed forward so quickly. The second run of 80,000 copies was printed soon after the first and the final run of 30,000 copies was printed in 1935. These printings were intended for the masses rather than the party elite that received the first run.

In 1935, The I.V. Stalin White Sea - Baltic Sea Canal was translated into English, although the translation did not match the Russian original in either its organization of chapters and sections or the progression of its narrative. The English translation tended to emphasize the content of the text rather than the overarching structure and ideology behind it. Indeed, both the British and American titles of the translated work fail to emphasize Stalin's name in the official name of the canal. Although the individual translators are never credited, they were likely Soviets working with the intention of creating a version of the narrative that would be palatable to English-speaking readers. The very existence of an English translation emphasizes the importance of the construction project within Russia and its desire to highlight the achievement to audiences abroad.

At the time of its original publication, reviewers wrote favorable assessments of The I.V. Stalin White Sea - Baltic Sea Canal. Both the project's documentation of a period of restructuring and the collective nature of the volume garnered reviewers praise. Criticism initially focused on a lack of detail about the technical aspects behind the canal's construction or on the inability to capture the topic within a single volume, where many more works would be necessary to do it justice.

During the purges of 1937, the majority of OGPU personnel who were involved in the White Sea Canal construction, including Genrikh Yagoda, the head of the OGPU, were imprisoned or executed. At the same time, many copies of The I.V. Stalin White Sea - Baltic Sea Canal volume were destroyed although copies in private libraries were sometimes spared. Copies that remained bore physical depictions of the purges of the persons named within them when their names were scribbled out. The once publicly emphasized and celebrated construction project began to slip from public memory as its history was relegated and removed.

In The Gulag Archipelago, Alexander Solzhenitsyn describes the book as 'disgraceful' and 'the first in Russian literature to glorify slave labor.'

== Authors ==
Notably, not all of the volume's final authors were part of the writers' brigade tour of the canal zone and, conversely, not all of the writers in the brigade went on to contribute to the volume. (Note: A full list of the 120 members of the writers brigade has never been found. Using notes and the initials of writers, Cynthia Ruder has assembled the most complete list to date, which names sixty-six of the participants. It can be found in the appendix of her book Making History for Stalin – The Story of the Belomor Canal.)

The 1935 American printing of Belomor lists the authors as:

- L. Auerbach
- B. Agapov
- S. Alimov
- A. Berzin
- S. Budantzev
- S. Bulatov
- S. Dikovsky
- N. Dmitriev
- A. Ehrlich
- E. Gabrilovich
- N. Garnich
- G. Gausner
- S. Gecht
- K. Gorbunov
- M. Gorky
- V. Ivanov
- Vera Inber
- V. Kataev
- Z. Khatzrevin
- G. Korabelnikov
- B. Lapin
- A. Lebedenko
- D. Mirsky
- L. Nikulin
- V. Pertzov
- J. Rikatchev
- V. Schklovsky
- L Slavin
- A. Tikhonov
- A. Tolstoy
- B. Yassensky
- N. Yurgin
- K. Zelinsky
- M. Zoshchenko
