= Oleg Lupanov =

Russian mathematician (1932–2006)

- Born: Oleg Borisovich Lupanov; 2 June 1932; Leningrad, USSR
- Died: 3 May 2006 (aged 73); Moscow, Russia
- Education: Moscow State University
- Awards: Lenin Prize (1966)
- Scientific career
- Fields: Discrete Mathematics, Mathematical Cybernetics and Mathematical Logic
- Workplaces: Moscow State University; Institute of Applied Mathematics
- Doctoral advisor: Sergey Vsevolodovich Yablonsky
- Doctoral students: Bella Subbotovskaya

Oleg Borisovich Lupanov (Russian: Оле́г Бори́сович Лупа́нов; 2 June 1932 – 3 May 2006) was a Soviet and Russian mathematician, dean of the Moscow State University's Faculty of Mechanics and Mathematics (1980–2006), head of the Chair of Discrete Mathematics of the Faculty of Mechanics and Mathematics (1981–2006).

Together with his graduate school advisor, Sergey Yablonsky, he is considered one of the founders of the Soviet school of Mathematical Cybernetics. In particular he authored pioneering works on synthesis and complexity of Boolean circuits, and of control systems in general (Russian: Управляющие системы), the term used in the USSR and Russia for a generalization of finite-state automata, Boolean circuits and multi-valued logic circuits.

Ingo Wegener, in his book The Complexity of Boolean Functions, credits O. B. Lupanov for coining the term Shannon effect in his 1970 paper, to refer to the fact that almost all Boolean functions have nearly the same circuit complexity as the hardest function.

O. B. Lupanov is best known for his (k, s)-Lupanov representation of Boolean functions that he used to devise an asymptotically optimal method of Boolean circuit synthesis, thus proving the asymptotically tight upper bound on Boolean circuit complexity:

$$C(f)\le \frac{2^n}{n} + o\left(\frac{2^n}{n}\right).$$

== Biography ==
O. B. Lupanov graduated from Moscow State University's Faculty of Mechanics and Mathematics in 1955. He received his PhD in 1958 from the Academy of Sciences of the Soviet Union and his Doctorate degree in 1963. He began teaching at Moscow State University in 1959 and became professor there in 1967. From 1955 he had appointment at the Institute of Applied Mathematics and he was a professor at Faculty of Computational Mathematics and Cybernetics (1970–1980). He had served as the Dean of the Moscow State University's Faculty of Mechanics and Mathematics (1980–2006), and as the founding head of the Chair of Discrete Mathematics of the Faculty of Mechanics and Mathematics (1981–2006).

Lupanov became a corresponding member of the Academy of Sciences of the Soviet Union in 1972 and a full member of Russian Academy of Sciences in 2003. He was the lead scientist of the Keldysh Institute of Applied Mathematics since 1993 and was awarded the title of a distinguished professor of Moscow State University in 2002. He was a recipient of the prestigious Lenin Prize (1966) and of the Moscow State University's Lomonosov Award (1993).

His students count more than 30 PhD degree holders and 6 holders of the Soviet/Russian Doctorate degree. As a dean of the Faculty of Mechanics and Mathematics, he was known as a democratic and accessible person.

== Personal life ==
Lupanov died at around 7pm on 3 May 2006 in his office at the Faculty of Mechanics and Mathematics of Moscow State University.

Ad memoriam installed at the Faculty of Mechanics and Mathematics, Moscow State University
