= Psycho-Cybernetics =

1960 self-help book by Maxwell Maltz

Cover

Psycho-Cybernetics is a self-help book written by American writer Maxwell Maltz in 1960. Motivational and self-help experts in personal development, including Zig Ziglar, Tony Robbins, Brian Tracy have based their techniques on Maxwell Maltz. The book combines the cognitive behavioral technique of teaching an individual how to regulate self-concept, using theories developed by Prescott Lecky, with the cybernetics of Norbert Wiener and John von Neumann. The book defines the mind-body connection as the core in succeeding in attaining personal goals.

Maltz found that his plastic surgery patients often had expectations that were not satisfied by the surgery, so he pursued a means of helping them set the goal of a positive outcome through visualization of that positive outcome. Patients thinking that surgery will solve their problems is an example of the XY problem. Maltz became interested in why setting goals works. He learned that the power of self-affirmation and mental visualization techniques used the connection between the mind and the body. He specified techniques to develop a positive inner goal as a means of developing a positive outer goal. This concentration on inner attitudes is essential to his approach, as he believes that a person's outer success can never rise above the one visualized internally.

== The operator and the "mechanism" ==
Maxwell Maltz drew inspiration from Norbert Wiener's book, Cybernetics, which describes both animals and self-guided missiles he helped develop in WWII as goal-seeking mechanisms.

In Psycho-Cybernetics, Maltz observed from Wiener's work the following on cybernetic mechanisms:

1. There's a "mechanism" which
  can accept a "goal"
  has sensing equipment (cameras, radar, infrared, lasers)
  has a propulsion system
  has a correcting device
  has some form of memory
2. The operator gives the mechanism a goal and "starts" it
3. During propulsion, the mechanism subtracts what it senses from the goal from the data received
  If on track, nothing is done and it keeps going
  If off track, the correcting device shifts until "the goal minus what it senses" is on track.
4. The mechanism refers to successful moves in its memory, hitting the goal without having to search for the answer again.

He noted that Wiener sees that man operates the same way. From this, he drew the following conclusions on a human being:

1. A person, for what is conscious, is "the operator", which can identify and offer goals
2. What's traditionally called the "subconscious mind" isn't a "mind" but a cybernetic mechanism built on our nervous system.
  it can accept a goal--image and an emotion determines if it accepts it
  The mechanism has sensing equipment like the eyes and ears
  The various systems, primarily the musculature and nervous systems, propel the mechanism
  The nervous system works with other systems as the correcting device
  The memory can be used to see past successes, making future success more likely
3. The operator gives a goal to the mechanism (called the "Automatic Success Mechanism" and "Automatic Failure Mechanism", which refer to the same mechanism).
4. The mechanism responds no matter what, whether the goal is "positive" or "negative". It will move toward it.
5. The most powerful goal image is an image of ourselves, because it causes a wide variety of useful or harmful behaviors from the mechanism.
6. When successful responses are found, we can remember past successes, and our mechanism will repeat the successful response.

The core of nearly all bad results is the conscious giving bad goal images to the mechanism.

Maltz viewed worry, or focusing on negative possibilities, as generating negative goal images that cause the mechanism, the subconscious, the set of human systems like the musculature, to drive toward it. At the same time, he viewed it as evidence that you could generate goal imagery, and that you could "worry" about positive images instead of negative.

Positive results come from a positive goal focus. To see positive goals, he says that we need a realistic and adequate self-image that recognizes these goals as possible and consistent with the self.

He refers heavily to Prescott Lecky's idea that whatever is not consistent with the system of ideas a person has will get rejected. To have positive goals that the mechanism will move toward, the system of ideas, primarily the self-image, needs to be set so that the positive goal image will be consistent with the other ideas. This will allow the operator to comfortably keep the goal image in mind, which the mechanism will act on.

== Other key ideas ==
Maltz also teaches that:

- We act on our mental representation of things, not the things themselves. We could respond with fear appropriate to seeing a bear, whether it's an actual bear, an actor, or a large shaggy dog.
- Negative feedback should be used to correct toward our goals. If corrective action on negative feedback isn't progressing one toward a goal, the correct response is no response.
- In cybernetic mechanisms, once success is found, it is focused on and errors are forgotten. Maltz encourages readers to recall past successes and happy moments.
- He saw self-image change as self-image realization, "Oh, this is who I am". This is where dramatic behavior change happens.
- Hypnosis is the relaxed acceptance of ideas (beliefs). Accepted ideas determine what we're willing to see and therefore what goals we pass into the mechanism.
- Each (agonist) muscle has an opposite, antagonist muscle. When a hypnotist instructed a weight lifter that he couldn't pick up a pencil, he noted that the antagonistic muscles opposed his conscious effort, and he couldn't pick it up.
- Imagination: The first Key to Your Success Mechanism.

== Posthumous editions ==
Several adaptations have been produced since Maltz's death in 1975.

Year	Title	Author/Editor	Publisher	ISBN	Pages
1996	Psycho-Cybernetics 2000	Bobbe Sommer	Prentice Hall	ISBN 978-0132638494	376
2002	The New Psycho-Cybernetics	Dan Kennedy	Prentice Hall	ISBN 978-0735202856	336
2015	Psycho-Cybernetics, Updated and Expanded	Matt Furey	Tarcher Perigee	ISBN 978-0399176135	336
