= Znanie (educational organization, founded 1947) =

Soviet educational/propaganda organization, founded 1947

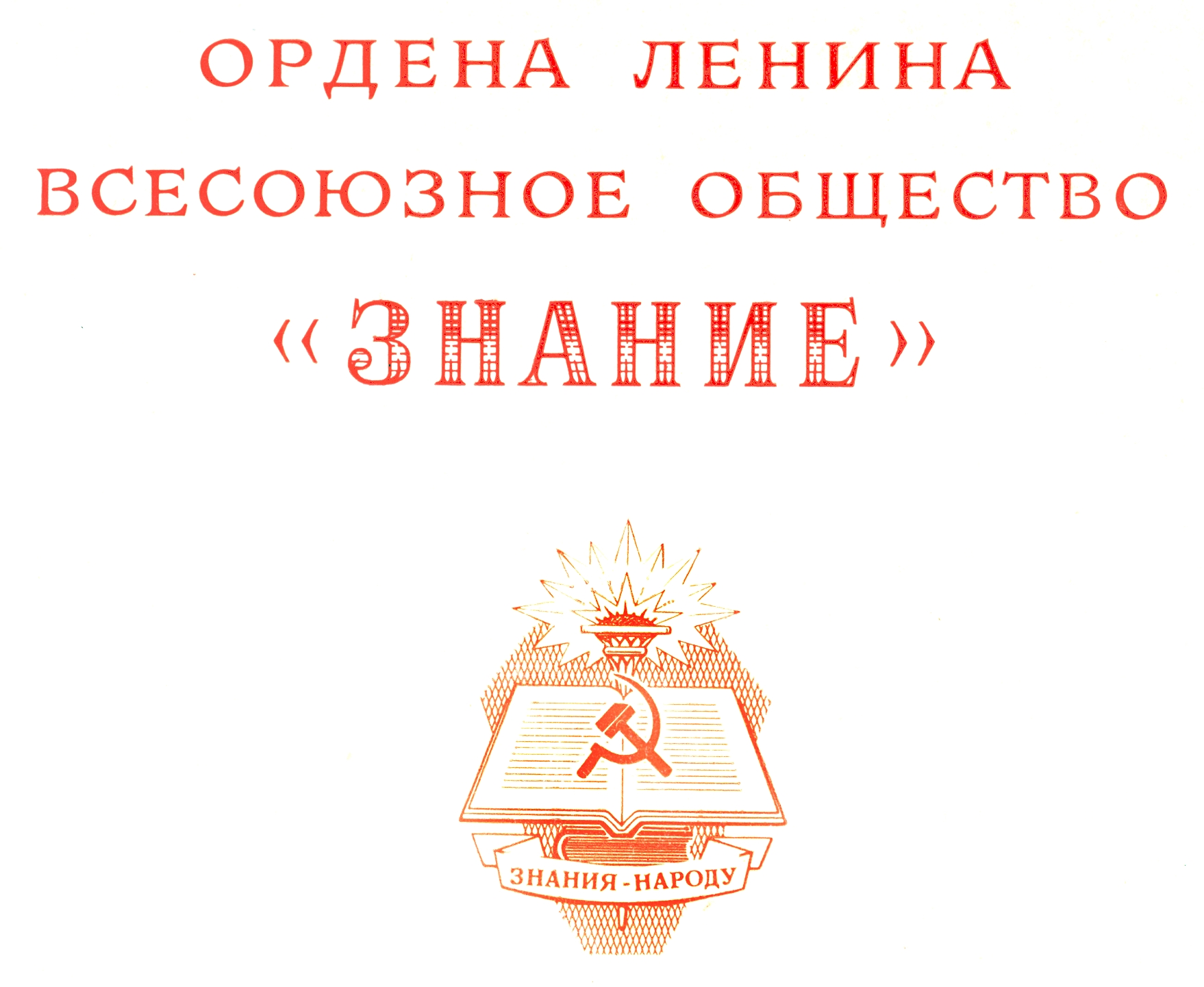
- Awards: Order of Lenin

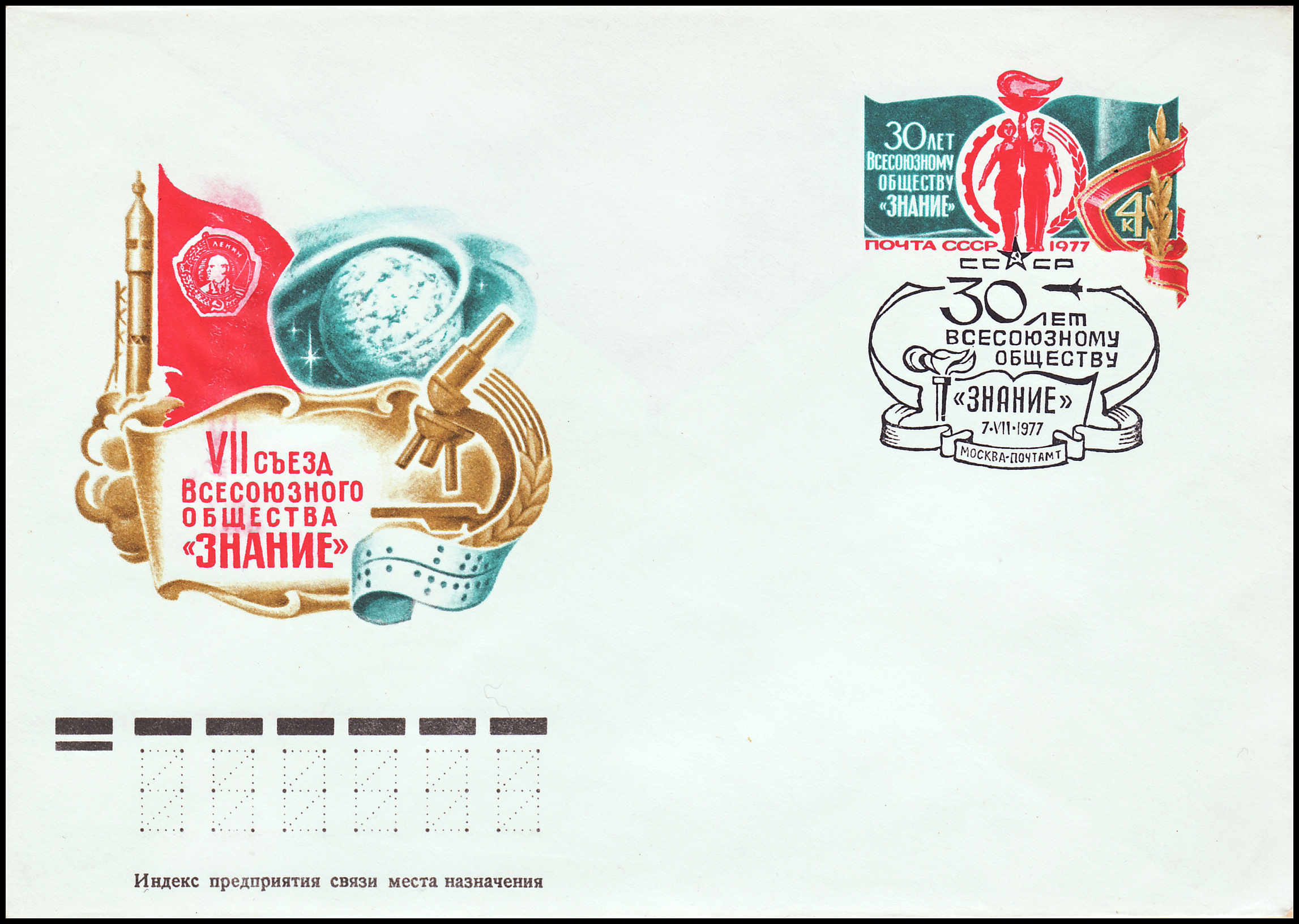
Stamped envelope of the USSR, issued in 1977 for the 30th anniversary of the society and its 7th congress

The All-Union Society "Znanie" (All-Union Society for the Dissemination of Political and Scientific Knowledge) was an educational and propaganda organization in the Soviet Union and Russia that arose in 1947. Its original name was the "All-Union Society for the Dissemination of Political and Scientific Knowledge". Its first president was Sergei Vavilov.

It was engaged in educational activities and anti-religious propaganda among the population of the USSR by giving lectures, as well as publishing relevant popular science literature. Like other Soviet public organizations, it was under the control of the Communist Party of the Soviet Union. The society had a publishing house "Znanie", (not to be confused with the identically named Russian publishing house running from 1898 to 1913). The society was awarded the Order of Lenin in 1972.

After the collapse of the USSR, the property of the society on the territory of Russia passed to the Knowledge Society of Russia, which became the legal successor of the All-Union Knowledge Society. The new organization fell into decline in the 1990s: the number of members decreased and many regional branches disappeared. In June 2016, the congress of the Knowledge Society of Russia decided to liquidate this organization.

In 2015, a new state-public organization "Znanie" was created by presidential decree of the Russian Federation. The new organization is not the official successor of any of the above.
