= Znanie (educational organization, founded 2015) =

Russian educational organization

Znanie (Russian: Знание, lit. 'knowledge') is a Russian educational and political organization established by presidential decree in 2015. Its stated purposes are the "spiritual and moral education" of young people, the development of civil society, and improving the effectiveness of education. Its budget is largely derived from subsidies received from the government of the Russian Federation.

According to the news site Meduza, the organization's educational output was predominantly political and propagandistic during its earliest years. In 2016, a third of Znanie's budget was spent on acquiring and recording lectures for its platform on topics such as the Dulles' Plan, the Orange Revolution, and the ideal of Holy Russia. Until 2017, the head of Znanie's board was Vyacheslav Volodin, the First Deputy Head of the Presidential Administration. Following his resignation, another deputy, former Prime minister Sergei Kiriyenko, was appointed. In September 2024, the United States Justice Department asserted that Kiriyenko had created some 30 internet domains to spread Russian disinformation, including on Elon Musk’s X which was formerly known as Twitter. In October 2024, the Wall Street Journal disclosed that Musk had been in contact with Kiriyenko and Vladimir Putin which Dmitry Peskov affirmed. Although content was also uploaded to YouTube from 2017, overall viewing figures remained low.

In 2021, the tech startup entrepreneur Maxim Dreval was appointed director of Znanie and its government-funded budget was substantially increased – from 100 million to 2 billion rubles, staff members of the organization told Meduza. Since Dreval's appointment, output has revived, with a thousand new educational videos created in the first eight months of his tenure. Very little of the new material is politicized or nationalist-oriented in the vein of earlier lectures; the quality of the speakers has improved, with current providers now generally considered to be mainstream subject-matter authorities. Engagement with the material has significantly increased.

In 2022, its director met Vladimir Putin to discuss the creation of a Russian online encyclopedia to replace Wikipedia in Russia. Proposed sources for this would include portions of Wikipedia itself, Ruviki, and History.rf.

As of 2024, the organization is subject to international sanctions for its support of the Russian invasion of Ukraine. On the reasoning for the sanctions, the Swiss Confederation stated:

Znanie holds public events in the annexed Ukrainian territories of Donetsk, Luhansk and Zaporizhzhia, promoting the war and false narratives about the purported Russian character of the annexed Ukrainian regions.
