= The Human Use of Human Beings =

1950 book on automation by Norbert Wiener

- First UK edition
- Author: Norbert Wiener
- Language: English
- Publisher: Houghton Mifflin (US); Eyre & Spottiswoode (UK)
- Publication date: 1950
- Media type: Book

The Human Use of Human Beings is a book by Norbert Wiener, the founding thinker of cybernetics theory and an influential advocate of automation; it was first published in 1950 and revised in 1954. The text argues for the benefits of automation to society; it analyzes the meaning of productive communication and discusses ways for humans and machines to cooperate, with the potential to amplify human power and release people from the repetitive drudgery of manual labor, in favor of more creative pursuits in knowledge work and the arts. The risk that such changes might harm society (through dehumanization or subordination of our species) is explored, and suggestions are offered on how to avoid such risk.

== What is cybernetics? ==
The word cybernetics refers to the theory of message transmission among people and machines. The thesis of the book is that:

society can only be understood through a study of the messages and the communication facilities which belong to it; and that in the future development of these messages and communication facilities, messages between man and machines, between machines and man, and between machine and machine, are destined to play an ever-increasing part. (p. 16)

Communication methods have entered a new realm, involving new technologies. Whether a transmission is between people, or between people and machines, the process is similar in that information is sent by one party and received by another, which can send a response. This is a type of feedback. People, animals, and plants all have the ability to take certain actions in response to their environments; in the same way, machines have feedback systems in order for their performances to be altered or evaluated in accordance with results. In the context of human/machine society, Wiener offers a definition of the message as:

"a sequence of events in time which, though in itself has a certain contingency, strives to hold back nature's tendency toward disorder by adjusting its parts to various purposive ends" (p. 27).

== Entropy and negentropy ==
The physical world has a "tendency toward disorder." Entropy (although a broad concept used in somewhat different ways across disciplines) roughly describes the way that isolated systems naturally become less and less organized with the passage of time; popularly understood as meaning a gradual decline into a state of chaos, the concept more accurately refers to the diffusion of energy toward a state of equilibrium, following the second law of thermodynamics.

Wiener believed that communication of information is essentially negentropic – it resists entropy – because it relies on organizational structures. There are two kinds of possible disorganizational forces, passive and active:

"Nature offers resistance to decoding, but it does not show ingenuity in finding new and undecipherable methods for jamming our communication with the outer world" (pp. 35–36).

Nature's passive resistance is in contrast to active resistance, like that of a chess opponent. This is similar to Einstein's view, expressed in his famous comment:

"The Lord is subtle but he is not vicious".

== Potential for learning ==
An increase of information, whether communicated by a living being or a machine, will increase organization. The feedback systems of an organism and those of a machine (informational organization in machines does not necessarily constitute "vitality" or a "soul") function in a similar way, allowing either to make assessments and act on the actual effectiveness of previous actions; when such feedback modifies not just a discrete action but an entire set of behaviors, Wiener calls this learning.

== Forms and patterns ==
The individuality of a being is a certain intricate form, not an enduring substance. In order to understand an organism, it must be thought of as a pattern which maintains itself through homeostasis – life continues by maintaining an internal balance of various factors such as temperature and molecular structure. While the material substances that compose a living being may be constantly replaced by nearly identical ones, an organism continues functioning with the same identity as long as the pattern is kept sufficiently intact. Since patterns can be transmitted, modified, or duplicated, they are therefore a kind of information. Based on this, Wiener suggests it should be theoretically possible to transmit the entirety of a living person as a message (which is practically indistinguishable from the concept of physical teleportation) – although he admits that the obstacles to such a process would be great, because of the enormous amount of information embodied in a person, and the difficulty of reading or writing it.

== Science, law, and industry ==
According to Wiener, the "progress" of human society as we conceive it today did not exist until four hundred years ago, but now we have entered "a special period in the history of the world" (p. 46). The progress of recent centuries has changed our world so dramatically that humans are being forced to adapt to the new environmental order or disorder that we are still creating. Wiener believes the quickness and range of our adaptability has always been the strong point of the human species, which distinguishes us from even the most intelligent of other living creatures. Our advancements in technology have created new opportunities along with new restrictions.

Wiener expects that improved sensory mechanics will allow machines to react to changes in stimuli and adapt more efficiently to their surroundings. He suggests that this type of machine would be most useful in factory assembly lines, freeing humans to supervise and to use their creative abilities.

Medicine can benefit from robotic advances in the design of prostheses for the handicapped. Wiener mentions the Vocorder, a device from Bell Telephone Company that creates visual speech. He discusses the possibility of creating an automated prosthesis that inputs speech directly into the brain for processing, effectively giving deaf individuals the ability to "hear" speech again. Progress in these areas is ongoing and rapid, exemplified by such devices as the palatometer, a new device created to replace a damaged larynx; it uses a speech synthesizer to recreate words based on its ability to monitor tongue movements. This device effectively rids people with damaged larynxes of the robotic tones associated with artificial speech synthesizers (like the one famously used by disabled physicist Stephen Hawking), enabling people to have more natural social interactions.

Machines, in Wiener's opinion, are meant to interact harmoniously with humanity and provide respite from the industrial trap we have made for ourselves. Wiener describes the automaton as inherently necessary to humanity's societal evolution. People could be free to expand their minds, pursue artistic careers, while automatons take over assembly line production to create necessary commodities. These machines must be "used for the benefit of man, for increasing his leisure and enriching his spiritual life, rather than merely for profits and the worship of the machine as a new brazen calf" (p. 162).

== How can automata harm human society? ==
Though hopeful that humanity will ultimately prosper by the use of automatons, he mentions a few ways this relationship with technology could be detrimental. The immediate danger is that just as less sophisticated machines deprived the laborer of the only commodity he had to trade, so in the near future almost all workers would be out of a job. Automatons must not be taken for granted, because with advances in technology that allow them to learn, the machines may be able to escape human control if humans do not continue proper supervision of them. We might become entirely dependent on them, or even controlled by them. There is danger in trusting decisions to something which cannot think abstractly, and may therefore be unlikely to identify with intellectual human values which are not purely utilitarian.

== Importance and influence of the book ==
Norbert Wiener's book was the forerunner of studies in cybernetics, and has influenced many theorists. It has impacted the fields of computers and technology, engineering, biology, sociology, and a broad range of other sciences. Numerous books have been published in relation to cybernetics theory which explore alternative concepts and models of feedback, human/machine relationships, systems science, and industrial advancement. William Ross Ashby, another founder of cybernetics, wrote the book Introduction to Cybernetics, which presents many new interpretations and definitions. Other theorists have produced writings on systems, communication, and the human experience in cybernetics. N. Katherine Hayles, author of How We Became Posthuman: Virtual Bodies in Cybernetics, Literature, and Informatics, describes the effects of technology in the age of virtual information and what it means for humans to live in an ever-advancing society. The American Society for Cybernetics (ASC) is a research association founded in 1964, the same year Wiener died, and is dedicated to the cooperative understanding and further improvement of cybernetics theory.

The Human Use of Human Beings was translated to French in 1950 as Cybernétique et société (Paris : 10/18).
