= Sobolev Institute of Mathematics =

Russian research institute

Coordinates: 54.846°N 83.104°E

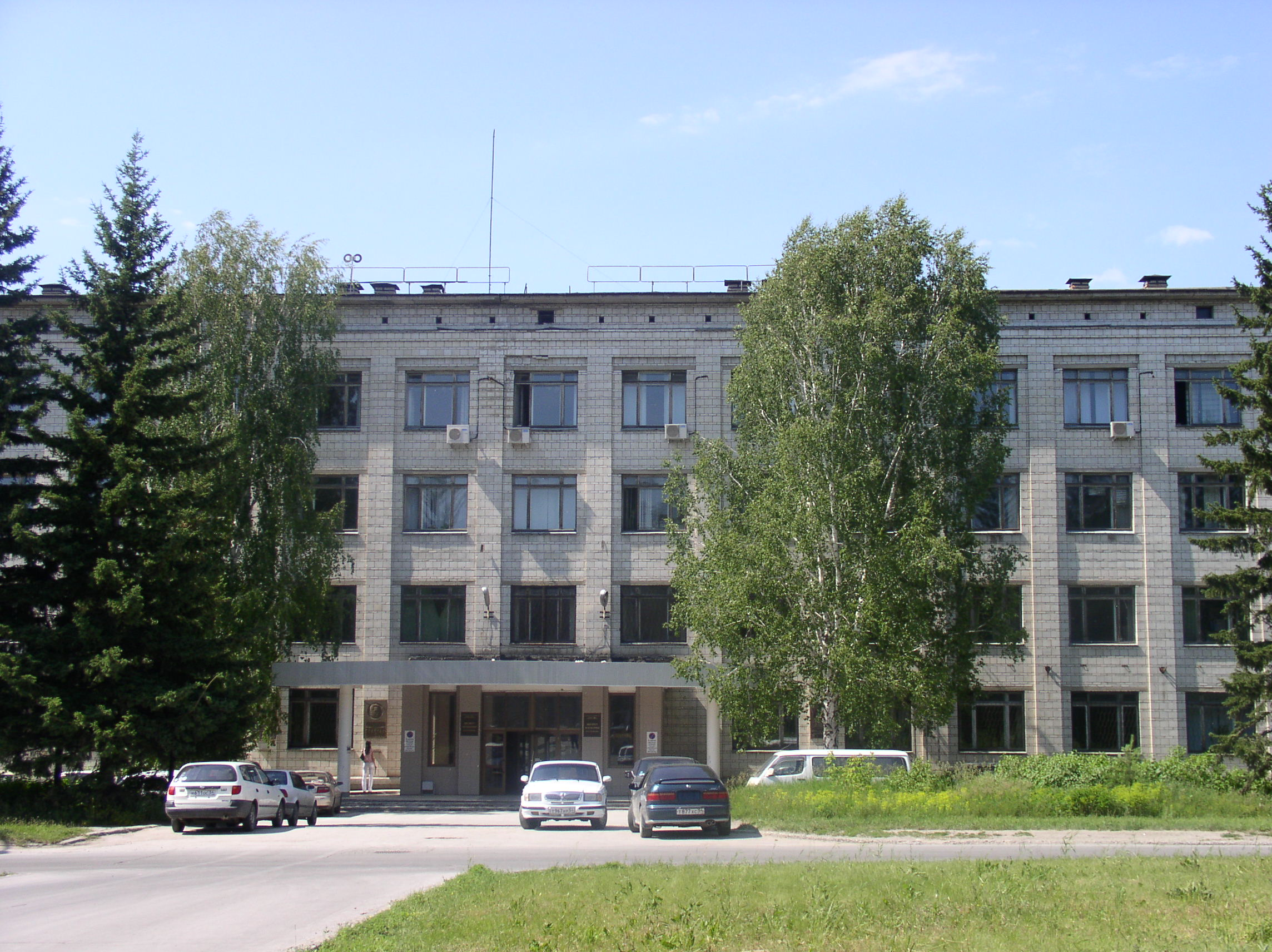
Sobolev Institute of Mathematics in 2007

The Sobolev Institute of Mathematics (SIM) was founded in 1957 by Sergei Sobolev. It is located in Akademgorodok and it constitutes part of the Siberian Branch of the Russian Academy of Sciences. Sergey S. Goncharov is the director.

The institute was founded as part of a broader project developed by Sobolev, Mikhail Lavrentyev and Sergey Khristianovich which received official support on 18 May 1957. The broader project led to the foundation of the Novosibirsk State University and the town of Akademgorodok. However SIM was one of the first academic institutes to be set up being founded in 1957.

== Journals ==
- Algebra and logic Editor: Yuri L. Ershov
- Siberian Mathematical Journal Editor-in-Chief: Yuri L. Ershov
- Siberian Advances in Mathematics Editor-in-Chief: Alexander A. Borovkov
- Matematicheskie Trudy (Mathematical Proceedings) Editor-in-chief: Alexander A. Borovkov
- Journal of Applied and Industrial Mathematics Editor-in-Chief: Vladimir G. Romanov
- Siberian Electronic Mathematical Reports Editor-in-Chief: Andrei Yu. Vesnin
