= Maxwell Maltz =

American cosmetic surgeon (1899–1975)

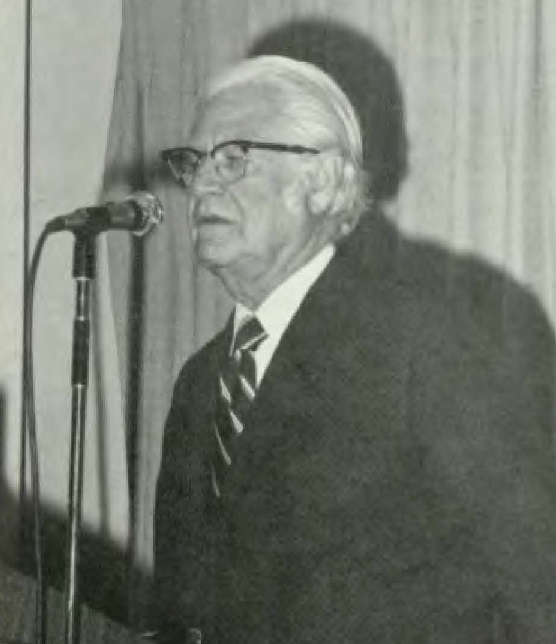
- Maltz c. 1975
- Born: March 10, 1899; Manhattan, New York City
- Died: April 7, 1975 (aged 76)
- Education: Doctor of Medicine
- Alma mater: Columbia University College of Physicians and Surgeons
- Occupations: Author, cosmetic surgeon
- Known for: Psycho-Cybernetics

Maxwell Maltz (March 10, 1899 – April 7, 1975) was an American cosmetic surgeon and the author of Psycho-Cybernetics (1960), which was a system of ideas that he claimed could improve one's self-image leading to a more successful and fulfilling life. He wrote several books, among which Psycho-Cybernetics was a long-time bestseller — influencing many subsequent self-help teachers. His orientation towards a system of ideas that would provide self-help is considered the forerunner of the now popular self-help books.

== Life and career ==
Maxwell Maltz was born March 10, 1899, in Manhattan's Lower East Side, the third child of Josef Maltz and Taube Elzweig, Jewish immigrants from what was then known as the town of Resche in the Austro-Hungarian Empire (today Rzeszów, Poland).

In 1923, Maltz graduated with a doctorate in medicine from the Columbia University College of Physicians and Surgeons. He also undertook training under German plastic surgeons who were considered most advanced in cosmetic surgery at the time.

In 1960, Psycho-Cybernetics: A New Way to Get More Living out of Life was first published by Prentice-Hall and appeared in a pocket book edition by 1969. It introduced Maltz's views that people must have an accurate and positive view of themselves before setting goals; otherwise they will get stuck in a continuing pattern of limiting beliefs. His ideas focus on visualizing one's goals and he believed that self-image is the cornerstone of all the changes that take place in a person. According to Maltz, if one's self-image is unhealthy or faulty — all of a person's efforts will end in failure.

On February 10, 1966, Dr. Maltz married Ms. Anna Harabin (1909-1993), his longtime secretary.

Maltz also wrote fiction, including a play called Unseen Scar (1946) and a novel, The Time is Now (1975). His autobiography, Doctor Pygmalion: The Autobiography of a Plastic Surgeon (1953), was popular and influential, discussed in many subsequent books on body and identity. It was re-titled Doctor Psycho-Cybernetics after his self-help work was published.

Although Psycho-Cybernetics was first published in 1960, as of 2008 it is one of 50 recommended in the book 50 Self-Help Classics.
