= Russian Church property restitution =

Process of transferring property to the ownership of religious organizations

Russian Church property restitution is an inaccurate term used by some mass media (the issue of restitution in the Russian Federation (RF) has never been officially raised by anyone) to refer to the process of transferring to the ownership of religious organizations (primarily the Russian Orthodox Church (ROC)) certain categories of property owned by several religious structures before 1918 (the ROC, as a centralized religious organization with the rights of a legal entity in the Russian Empire, did not have the rights of a religious organization) and transferred, in accordance with the decree of the Council of People's Commissars of the Russian Soviet Federative Socialist Republic of 20 January 1918 "On Separation of Church from State and School from Church", to the ownership of the state – the Soviet Union, and after 1991, by succession, to the Russian Federation.

On 30 November 2010, Russian president Dmitry Medvedev signed the Federal Law of the Russian Federation # 327-FZ "On the Transfer of Religious Property Owned by the State or Municipalities to Religious Organizations", which defines "the procedure of free transfer of religious property owned by the federal government, constituent territories of the Russian Federation or municipalities to religious organizations for ownership or free use".

Between 1995 and 2010, about 1.1 thousand religious buildings were transferred to religious organizations (9.9% of the number of cultural objects that are religious monuments as of December 1995). According to Law 327, by 2018 about one thousand buildings will be transferred to the Russian Orthodox Church. Thus, by 2018, about 80% of the surviving religious monuments nationalized during the Soviet period remained in the hands of the state.

== Transferring Church Property before 2001 ==
Articles 12 and 13 of the Decree of the Council of People's Commissars of the Russian Republic of 20 January 1918, "On the Separation of Churches and School from Church", state the following "12. No church or religious society shall have the right to own property. They do not have the rights of a legal person. 13. All property of existing church and religious societies in Russia is declared to be the property of the people. The buildings and objects intended especially for liturgical purposes shall be given to the respective religious communities for free use by special decisions of the local or central state authorities".

After religious organizations in the USSR acquired the rights of a juridical person in accordance with the Law of the USSR dated 1 October 1990 "On Freedom of Conscience and Religious Organizations", their rights to the property already used by them gratuitously remained the same; property rights arose only to the property newly created at their expense.

Some of the confiscated buildings were demolished, but many survived until the late 1980s. Most of those that survived were rebuilt and used as administrative buildings. Some religious buildings were turned into museums and placed under state protection as historical monuments. Many of the surviving religious buildings were in a dilapidated and damaged condition by the end of the 1980s. Reports on the inspection of former religious buildings by the Soviet authorities have survived. Thus, in 1985–1986, a survey of surviving religious buildings in the Tatar ASSR was conducted, which revealed more than 260 religious buildings (58 of which were under state protection as objects of history and religious architecture) that had fully or partially preserved their exterior appearance, which were divided into the following groups according to their technical condition:

- Good condition – 19 buildings;
- Satisfactory condition – 144 buildings;
- Emergency condition – 97 buildings (84 of which are vacant).

During Perestroika, the process of returning surviving religious buildings to believers was spontaneous: under pressure from believers, since the late 1980s local authorities have been handing over previously nationalized buildings. In some cases, individual representatives of clergy and believers resorted to protest actions to obtain the buildings. For example, the Orthodox community of Dalnerechensk (Primorsky Krai), which was registered in 1985, threatened the authorities to start a hunger strike on 1 February 1990, if they did not return the church building that had been taken away in 1929 and later given for a museum. Previously, the community had been repeatedly denied the return of the building (in 1988 and 1989). The threat on the eve of the elections of the First Congress of People's Deputies of the RSFSR (the elections were to be held on 4 March 1990) had an effect: on 26 January 1990, a meeting of the Primorsky Krai Executive Committee decided the issue in favor of the community of believers. On 9 July 1990 the building was handed over to the believers, and a week later it was consecrated. The director of the museum, located in the building of the temple, T. N. Guselnikova (since 1990 she was also a deputy of the Regional Council) went on hunger strike in protest against the closure of the museum, but the building remained with the believers.

According to the Decree of the President of the Russian Federation dated 31 December 1991, No. 135-rp "On the Return of Buildings and Religious Literature to the Russian Orthodox Church", the building of the Council for Religious Affairs under the Cabinet of Ministers of the USSR, together with its library of religious literature, was transferred to the ROC.

The Order of the President of the Russian Federation dated 23 April 1993 No. 281-rp "On the Transfer of Religious Buildings and Other Property to Religious Organizations" instructed the Russian Federation Government to prepare "a gradual transfer of religious buildings, structures and adjacent territories and other religious property in federal ownership to religious organizations for use for religious, educational, charitable and other statutory purposes related to the activities of confessions". At the same time, Decree No. 281-rp contained a mild reservation that the transfer should "take in mind, when possible, the interests of culture and science".

On 14 March 1995, the Government of the Russian Federation adopted Resolution No. 248 "On the Procedure of Transfer of State Religious Property to Religious Organizations". It defined the general principles of transfer of religious property to ownership, use or joint use with cultural institutions. The Ministry of Culture of the Russian Federation is responsible for transferring property related to historical and cultural monuments, the Federal Agency for State Property Management is responsible for other objects. The decision on the transfer is taken by the Government of the Russian Federation.

In 1995 there were 12107 religious monuments under state protection (the absolute majority – Orthodox), of which about a third (3743) were empty, according to the official data (letter of the Ministry of Culture of the Russian Federation dated 15 December 1995).

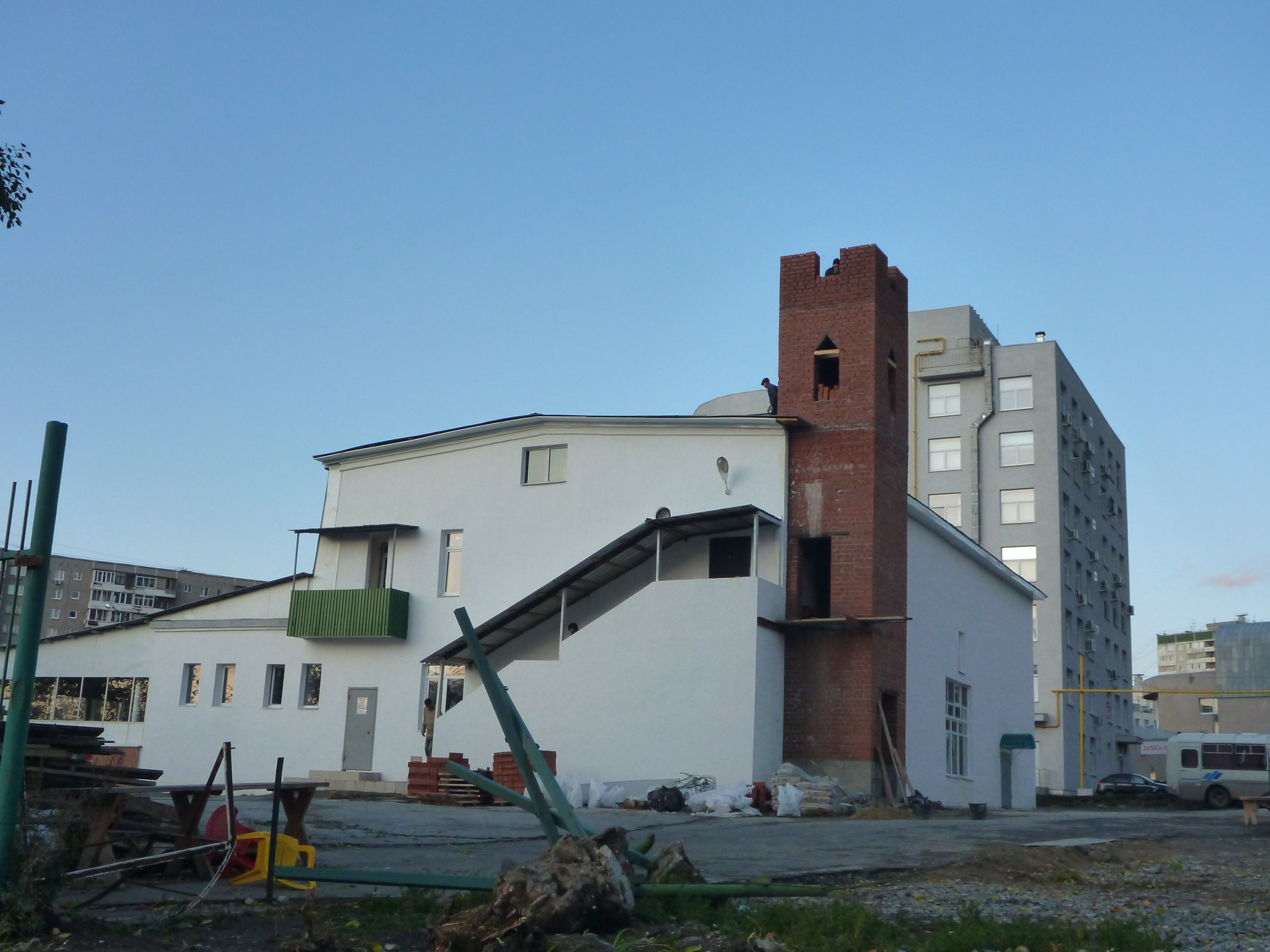
Ekaterinburg's Komsomolets Cinema being rebuilt into Abu Hanifa Mosque (September 2019)

Among the religious objects transferred to the Russian Orthodox Church in the 1990s are the Donskoy Monastery, the Moscow State University. St.Tatiana Church, the Church of Saint Sergius in Rogozhskaya Sloboda in Moscow, and the Holy Trinity Ipatiev Monastery in Kostroma.

In 1990s, also were cases of transferring of buildings to religious organizations to replace those confiscated and destroyed during the Soviet period. For example, in Yekaterinburg in the 1990s, the building of the Komsomolets Cinema (built during the Soviet period) was transferred to the Muslim community to replace the mosque destroyed during the Soviet period. In 2012, the Abu Hanifa Mosque began to function in the transferred building. In 2022, the Ekaterinburg authorities officially approved the "religious use" of the land under the mosque.

At the same time, in the 1990s, regulations were adopted restricting the possibility of transfer of previously nationalized property to religious organizations. The Decree of the Government of the Russian Federation dated 14 March 1995, No. 248, completely prohibited the transfer to the ownership of religious organizations of historical and cultural monuments that are among the most valuable objects of the cultural heritage of the peoples of the Russian Federation. The Federal Law "On the Museum Fund and Museums in the Russian Federation", adopted in 1996, prohibits the transfer to religious organizations of movable religious objects from museum funds (icons, ecclesiastical objects and reliquaries with relics of saints).

== 2000-s ==
In 2000, the Jubilee Council of Bishops of the Russian Orthodox Church sent a letter to the President of the Russian Federation, V. V. Putin, stating that the process of restitution of church property in Russia "has not only not been completed, but has not really begun" and calling for the transfer to the Church of churches, icons, shrines, premises for Sunday schools, theological schools, orphanages, regional church institutions, as well as land for monastic households. At the same time, the letter stated that "the Church does not wish to claim all the property that was at her disposal in this or that historical period".

On 30 June 2001, the Russian Government adopted Resolution No. 490 "On the Procedure of Transfer of State Property of Religious Purpose to Religious organizations". In contrast to the 1995 Resolution, it gave a definition of the term "property of religious purpose" (see paragraph 1):

Buildings and structures with associated land, including monasteries and other religious complexes, constructed for the conduct and support of worship, prayer and religious meetings, other religious rites and ceremonies, and professional religious education) and movable property for religious purposes (items of interior decoration of religious buildings and structures or items intended for liturgical and other religious purposes).

The transfer of property is carried out exclusively by the Federal Agency for State Property Management, in case of historical and cultural monuments – in coordination with the Ministry of Culture of the Russian Federation; in case of objects of federal significance; and with the authorities of the constituent territories of the Russian Federation for the protection of historical and cultural monuments in case of objects of local significance (paragraphs 5 and 6). The Resolution established the list of documents to be attached to the application of a religious organization for the transfer of property (including the conclusion of the state body for the protection of historical and cultural monuments of a constituent entity of the Russian Federation on the possibility of transferring a historical and cultural monument into the ownership or use of a religious organization, and in case of movable property – a letter from the organization to which the said property is transferred on the nature of its use and on the consent (refusal) to transfer the property to a religious organization or its joint use).

In 2004, the State Duma of the Russian Federation adopted the law "On the free transfer to religious associations for permanent use of land under buildings of religious purpose".

In 2007, the Ministry of Economic Development and Trade of the Russian Federation began drafting a federal law on the transfer of religious property owned by the state to religious organizations. It was reported that the concept of the bill was approved by the head of the government commission, First Deputy Prime Minister Dmitry Medvedev.

In 2008, Patriarch Alexy II stated that the ROC would not raise the issue of restitution. However, he welcomed the state's steps to return church buildings.

In November 2007, at the request of Patriarch Alexy II, President Vladimir Putin transferred a part of the robe of Jesus together with the chasse from the Moscow Kremlin Museums to the Cathedral of Christ the Savior, despite the protests of the museum management. In July 2008 another 10 exhibits from the collection of the Moscow Kremlin Museums were transferred to the ROC, although these exhibits never belonged to the church: before the revolution they were the property of the royal family, then it belonged to the state.

In November 2008, Patriarch Alexy II asked the Tretyakov Gallery to give the Trinity -icon by Andrey Rublev- to the Trinity Lavra of St. Sergius for a festive service. The management of the gallery was ready to give the icon, but the ordinary employees of the museum were against it. As a result of an active campaign in the press, the icon remained in the museum.

In November 2009, at the request of Patriarch Kirill, the Ministry of Culture of the Russian Federation decided to transfer the Toropets icon of the Mother of God from the Russian Museum to the new Alexander Nevsky Church in Knyazhyi Ozero, Moscow Region. In September 2010, the Russian Museum extended the contract for the storage of the icon in the church until March 2011.

== 2010: discussion and adoption of the draft of the law ==
In January 2010, Patriarch Kirill met with Russian prime minister Vladimir Putin. The meeting was attended by the Minister of Culture Alexander Avdeyev and the head of the Federal Property Management Agency Yury Petrov. Putin promised to transfer the Novodevichy Convent to the Russian Orthodox Church (the transfer took place in March of the same year). The drafting of a law on the transfer of religious property accelerated after the meeting.

On 10 February 2010, the text of the draft law was published on the website of the Slavic Legal Center. However, until 10 February 2010, there was no official publication of the draft law by its author, the Ministry of Economic Development of Russia. As of 18 February 2010, it was still being finalized and had not been submitted to the Russian government, according to Deputy Minister of Culture Andrey Busygin.

=== Museum and cultural professionals' statements ===
On 19 February 2010, a letter from a number of employees of leading Russian museums to Russian President Dmitry Medvedev was circulated, in which they urged not to transfer religious monuments from museum collections to the ROC, justifying their position by the fact that: "the transfer of ancient churches with frescoes and icons, as well as icons and precious liturgical utensils from museum collections to church use will take them out of the context of the cultural life of society and may lead to their destruction".

On 3 March 2010, art and science workers published an Open Letter to Patriarch Kirill in which they spoke of the possible consequences of the transfer of historical and cultural monuments recognized as national and world heritage: "Depriving ancient monuments of their museum status will mean the refusal to recognize ecclesiastical and, more broadly, religious art as an integral part of the great culture of Russia, and will ultimately lead to the division of the nation solely on the confessional principle. Museum workers called on the Patriarch to help suspend the preparation of the law and involve the museum community in its development along with representatives of religious organizations.

On 25 February 2010, Yelena Gagarina, director of the Moscow Kremlin Museums, said that the bill on the transfer of museum property to the church could lead to its loss: "If you go to any Catholic church abroad, you will see that there are services and tourists, images and frescoes are museum exhibits and belong to the state, and the church is responsible for them. As far as our draft law is concerned, I am assuming that the situation is going to be completely different".

On 9 March 2010, Gennady Popov, director of the Andrei Rublev Museum of Ancient Russian Culture and Art in Moscow, stated that the document "has a subversive character" during a meeting of representatives of the Russian Orthodox Church with museum directors and cultural figures. The next day, Popov was received by Patriarch Kirill; after the meeting, an official report was issued by the press service of the Moscow Patriarchate, stating: "<...> As was noted during the conversation, the issue of conflict between the museum community and the Church is largely far-fetched and artificially created". On 17 March, Popov expressed the opinion that Russia does not yet have sufficient conditions for the adoption of a law on the transfer of religious property to religious organizations: "I see no reason for this law. Yes, buildings should be transferred slowly, but there is no legal basis for the protection of the transferred objects, everyone can do whatever he wants. Who is going to control, how is going to control, who is going to be responsible – there is nothing about it".

On 23 September 2010, Alexander Shkurko, director of the State Historical Museum, said in an interview with Kommersant: "It is necessary to form a list of 50–60 objects that would not be transferred to religious organizations, including UNESCO World Heritage Sites, especially valuable objects of cultural heritage of the peoples of the Russian Federation and monuments of wooden architecture. If all ecclesiastical and cultural objects are given to the church, museums will lose about 0.5 billion rubles in annual income, which will lead to a reduction in salaries and an increase in the cost of admission tickets". He also noted the need to include in the law a norm on the joint use of cultural objects of the church and museums.

In addition, on 3 March 2010, an open appeal by a number of Russian cultural figures to the President of the Russian Federation Dmitry Medvedev was published, in which the authors expressed their conviction that "the acquisition by the Church of once-lost temples and sanctuaries, including priceless masterpieces created by ancient masters, is not only an act of restoring historical justice, but also a return to the original design of their creators" and called on museum workers "to cooperate with the Church, in which professionalism and experience can be successfully applied".

After the Federal Assembly passed the law "On the Transfer of Religious Property Owned by the State or Municipality to Religious Organizations" in November 2010, museum workers again criticized it: "... the law was and still is anti-cultural, anti-social and absolutely egregious in terms of its inconsistency with existing legislation, including the Constitution, the Civil Code and a number of federal laws in the culture field":

=== Public authorities' statements ===
In January 2010, Russian Prime Minister Vladimir Putin stated that a draft federal law "On the Transfer of Religious Property Owned by the State or Municipalities to Religious Organizations" had been developed.

On 9 March 2010, Deputy Minister of Culture of the Russian Federation Andrey Busygin, during a round table discussion on the problems of the return of church property, expressed the opinion that the process of the complete transfer of the Novodevichy Convent to the Russian Orthodox Church will become a model for the development of a law on the return of religious property to the Church.

=== Representatives of religious organizations' statements ===
On 17 February 2010 the opinion of Archpriest Vsevolod Chaplin, Chairman of the Synodal Department of the Moscow Patriarchate for Relations between the Church and Society, was published, according to which "the people who are stirring up trouble about this bill" do not understand what it is about: the current draft law does not provide for restitution; it says that the status of objects of the Museum Fund will continue to be regulated by the legislation on museums; it deals exclusively with property for religious purposes, and 90 percent of it concerns buildings and properties with religious buildings.

On 24 February 2010, the chairman of the architectural commission of the St. Petersburg diocese, professor of the St. Petersburg Theological Academy and the Academy of Arts Hegumen Alexander (Fedorov), commenting on the letter of 150 museum workers, noted that in Russia it is necessary to restore the system of large and small church museums that existed before the 1917 revolution; in his opinion, the question of the location of icons and objects of small forms of church art should be decided collegially and separately for each object.

On 4 March 2010, Vladimir Legoyda, head of the Synodal Information Department, stated that the draft law on the return of church property concerns buildings, not museum exhibits: "The draft law, which is causing concern among many cultural and artistic figures, does not concern museum and archive holdings". On the same day, Patriarch Kirill of Moscow, speaking to professors and students at the Moscow Institute of Engineering Physics, called for the development of a constructive dialogue between the Church and cultural figures regarding the return of Church organizations to the Church. But we will do everything to prevent this wedge from being driven".

On 5 March 2010, Vsevolod Chaplin made a statement suggesting that vested interests may be behind the position of the directors of a number of Russian museums against the transfer of religious property to the Church.

On 25 March 2010, Archpriest Vsevolod Chaplin, Chairman of the Information Department of the Moscow Patriarchate V. R. Legoyda and Archimandrite Tikhon (Shevkunov) published an open appeal in connection with a letter from representatives of the museum community to Russian president Dmitry Medvedev, in which they gave their answers to the questions of museum workers.

On 19 April 2010, at a meeting with the leadership of the Urals Federal District in Chelyabinsk, Patriarch Kirill stated: "There is no dispersal of museum holdings, no destruction of assets and expositions, and there will not be, because we are aware that icons in museum exhibitions, unlike icons in storerooms, also serve the spiritual enlightenment of the people.

On 17 May 2010, Archpriest Vsevolod Chaplin walked out of the Public Chamber session devoted to the bill on the transfer of religious property to the Church, where most of the speakers were critical of the bill – in protest against the biased and "manipulative" organization of the hearings.

On 23 June 2010, the Chief Rabbi of Russia (FJCR) Berel Lazar announced his intention to return all Jewish religious buildings taken away after the October Revolution.

=== Actions of the central governing structures of the religious organizations ===
By the decision of the Holy Synod of the Russian Orthodox Church of 5 March 2010, the Patriarchal Council for Culture was established under the chairmanship of the Patriarch of Moscow and All Russia, whose competence includes "issues of dialogue and interaction with state cultural institutions, creative unions, public associations of citizens working in the field of culture, as well as with sports and other similar organizations in the countries of the canonical space". Tikhon Shevkunov, archimandrite of the Sretensky Monastery, was appointed Executive Secretary of the Patriarchal Council.

=== The discussion of the draft law in the State Duma ===
In September 2010, the State Duma of the Russian Federation began to consider the draft law. In comparison with the preliminary versions, a clause was added to the text of the law stating that it does not apply to objects belonging to the Museum, Archive and Library Fund of the Russian Federation. Thus, the law did not concern the transfer of movable property, which was actively opposed by museum workers. At the same time, the list of particularly valuable objects of the cultural heritage of the peoples of the Russian Federation, which are not subject to transfer to religious organizations, disappeared from the text of the law.

The discussion of the draft law in the Civic Chamber of the Russian Federation led to a division among its members. The conclusion of the expert commission of the chamber stated that "the draft law contradicts a number of principles established by the Constitution of the Russian Federation and international normative acts. According to the text of the bill, "both the property and the cultural institution itself, to which the property is assigned, may be classified as objects of special value. Thus, the draft law allows for the possibility of withdrawing certain objects from the state property, which is contrary to the legislation". Its adoption "will lead to the impossibility of access to the objects for citizens of other religions". In addition, the conclusion noted that "many objects of cultural heritage cannot be used for religious rituals without causing serious damage to them". In this regard, it was proposed to "introduce an expert examination of the condition of the object, the result of which should determine the decision on the possibility of its transfer". Several members of the Public Chamber, mainly representatives of religious organizations, did not agree with this conclusion. It was noted that this was the greatest internal conflict in the Public Chamber since its creation. The Public Chamber did not divide church property.

=== Adoption of the law ===
The law was passed by the State Duma on 19 November 2010, approved by the Federation Council on 24 November 2010, and signed by Russian president Dmitry Medvedev on 30 November 2010.

After President Medvedev signed the law, Patriarch Kirill declared: "In the area of church-state relations in Russia today there is not a single principled issue left that would involve any kind of conflict between the church and the state".

According to Hermitage Director Mikhail Piotrovsky, "this law, like almost all of our new legislation, is hostile to culture".

== Religious sites ==
More than 11,000 cultural heritage sites across Russia are subject to transfer to believers under the 2010 law. At the time of the adoption of Law No. 327, there were 6,584 federal religious sites recognized as cultural heritage sites and subject to transfer to believers (6,402 Orthodox, 79 Muslim, 68 Catholic, 13 Evangelical Lutheran, 21 Buddhist and 1 Jewish). Another 4,417 sites subject to transfer were monuments of regional significance (4,241 Orthodox, 86 Muslim, 76 Catholic and 14 Jewish).

Thus, the distribution of religious institutions subject to transfer under the Law of 2010 by religious organizations for 2010 in Russia was the following:

- 10643 Orthodox (96.7% of the total);
- 165 Muslim (1.5% of the total);
- 144 Catholics (1.3% of the total);
- 21 Buddhist (0.2% of the total);
- 15 Jewish (0.1% of the total).

== The main differences between the 2010 Federal Law and the 2001 Government Regulation ==
In comparison with Decree No. 490 of 2001, the law broadens the concept of "religious property". It is considered to be "immovable property ... built for the implementation and/or provision of such activities of religious organizations as the performance of religious services, other religious rites and ceremonies, prayer and religious meetings, religious education, professional religious education, monastic activities, religious worship (pilgrimage), including buildings for the temporary residence of pilgrims, as well as movable property of religious purpose" (Article 2, paragraph 1, italics). Thus, the law facilitates the transfer to religious organizations of buildings that are not directly used for conducting religious services. At present such buildings often house educational, cultural or health institutions.

The law introduces an application procedure for the transfer of property. For the transfer of historical and cultural monuments, the list of additional documents and permits is abolished. The law does not provide for a special expert examination of the possibility of transferring a monument in terms of its state of preservation, as well as the need for coordination with the Ministry of Culture or regional bodies overseeing the preservation of monuments. There is no provision for joint use of the property by a religious organization and a cultural organization. The law does not designate a specific body responsible for making decisions on the transfer of property and its implementation, but refers to federal laws and regulations at the federal, regional, and municipal levels. The law sets clear conditions for the transfer of property: 6 years if the property is transferred to cultural organizations, unitary enterprises or if people live in there, and up to 2 years in other cases.

According to the law, the property must be used according to the charter of the religious organization. Already in 2007, the Ministry of Economic Development and Trade of the Russian Federation acknowledged that religious organizations will be able to "change the functional purpose of religious objects acquired in property for the purposes of entrepreneurship". In May 2010, the Ministry confirmed that the law does not prohibit, for example, renting premises if the charter of the religious organization allows it. According to experts, after the law on the transfer of religious property comes into force, the ROC will become one of the largest owners in Russia, comparable in asset value to such structures as Russian Railways and Gazprom, and a major player in the real estate market.

== Main problems ==
=== Preservation ===
One of the main problems that arise during the transfer of religious property is the issue of preservation of cultural monuments transferred to the church from museum funds. Thus, in 2002, on the territory of the Ipatiev Monastery in Kostroma, which is administered by the monastery, a unique wooden church, brought from the village of Spas-Vyozhi in the middle of the 20th century, burned down; the fire department received a report about the fire only one hour after the fire broke out, when it was impossible to save the monument. In the Boris and Gleb Monastery in Dmitrov, during the "renovation" of the fortress walls, a number of 17th-century objects were destroyed, including one of the towers. The Znamensky Cathedral in Kursk was severely distorted during the "restoration": the reconstruction of two bell towers above the western part of the church "would complicate the internal reconstruction of the building". Therefore, it was decided to build a northern bell tower, which was boldly attached to the outside of the refectory. During the construction of a new heating system the iconostasis of the Trinity Cathedral in Pskov suffered. According to the journalist M.N. Sitnikov, Theotokos of Bogolyubovo deteriorated while it was in the Cathedral of the Assumption of the Virgin of the Knyaginin Monastery in Vladimir.

It has been noted that in some cases church users have been able to ensure that monuments are properly preserved.

The problem of conservation, both in terms of the loss of exhibits and in terms of errors in restoration, also arises in relation to property located in museums. This problem is discussed in the context of the transfer of religious property to religious organizations. In particular, in 2006, during an internal museum inspection in the Russian section of the Hermitage, 221 exhibits were found to be missing. A government commission was organized, which, during the inspection of all museum funds in Russia, failed to find about 86 thousand objects out of 83 million in museums. In some cases, interference in the restoration process leads to the deterioration of artworks. In particular, according to I. V. Solovieva and I. A. Shalina of the Russian Museum, the restoration of the Toropets icon of the Mother of God in 1937 and 1957 (cleaning by N. V. Pertsev) led to the deterioration of the icon.

In February 2010, Nadezhda Nefedova noted that before the transfer of property to the Church it is necessary to bring the storage conditions in the temples to an acceptable state; it is also necessary to train the clergy in the discipline of "sacristy business", in the temples there should be staff involved in the organization of competent storage of icons and utensils.

=== Accessibility ===
Another problem in the late 2000s was limited access to a number of monuments, such as the necropolis of the Donskoy Monastery in Moscow. The Russian Orthodox Church responded to the comment about inaccessibility by saying that, unlike a museum, entry to a church is free for all.

The accessibility of objects in museum collections is largely limited. Between 3% and 5% of museum collections are on display, while the rest are in storage, which is difficult to access. The transfer of objects to churches can in some cases significantly increase the accessibility of exhibits. For example, the Toropets icon of the Mother of God could be seen by about 30 thousand people for the period of its storage in the Alexander Nevsky Church in Knyazhie Ozero until 3 February 2010.

=== The space availability problem ===
According to Article 5, Paragraph 4, cultural organizations, whose operational management includes the transferred property, should receive in return equivalent buildings, premises that ensure the statutory activities" of these organizations. For example, construction of a warehouse for the Kostroma Museum Reserve, which left the Ipatiev Monastery in 2005, is still unfinished.

In addition, for a number of cultural organizations, first of all museum reserves and fresco museums, it is impossible to provide "equivalent" premises, since their statutory activity is to preserve, study and exhibit these buildings and the paintings in them. It is impossible to provide them with similar churches with paintings by Rublev, Dionisius, Greck and other old Russian masters.

== Kaliningrad region case ==
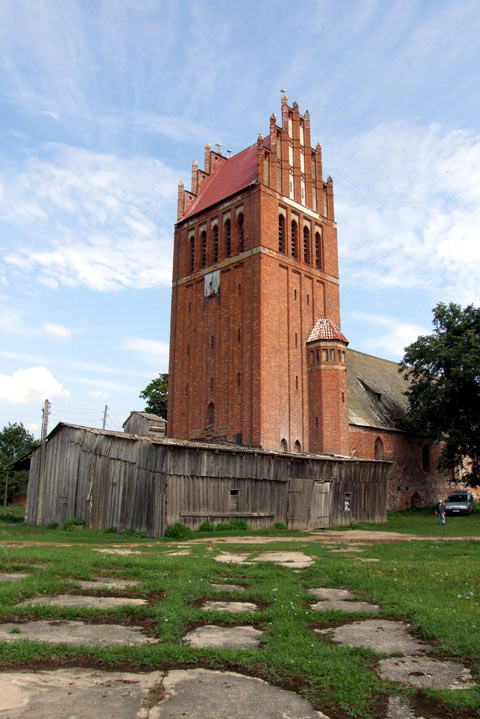
Kirkha in Druzhba settlement, used by Protestant community before being transferred to the ROC

The Kaliningrad region has a special situation. Until 1945 this region was a part of Germany (East Prussia). On this territory, according to A. P. Bakhtin, there were 222 churches of the XIII-XX centuries, 90 of which were almost completely destroyed, and another 67 were in a ruined state. Thus, in the Kaliningrad region 45 churches and kirchas from the Germanic period survived in a ruined state.

Protestant and Catholic religious buildings were transferred to the Russian Orthodox Church, i.e. objects that have no relation to the history of the ROC or Russia, some of which were already in use by non-ROC parishes at the time of the transfer and had incurred substantial renovation costs. Moreover, not only churches, but also old parish houses, castle ruins, or simply land where church buildings once stood, were transferred to the ROC. Svetlana Sokolova, director of the Friedland Gate Museum, considered such a transfer a disaster for the historical heritage and the development of tourism, as all the links established by the previous users were destroyed. The hope of attracting EU funds for the restoration of the buildings is lost, while the Church does not have enough funds not only for the quality restoration work, but also for the preservation of the existing buildings.

In February 2010, the Georgian castle near Chernyakhovsk was transferred to the ROC, and in May, the former churches in the villages of Vladimirovo and Druzhba were transferred to the ROC. The Church in Druzhba was used by the local Lutheran community of Pravdinsky District before its transfer to the ROC, and the community repaired and maintained the building to the best of its ability, making the kirkha one of the cultural centers of the settlement. Part of the funds for the repairs were raised privately in Germany, and the donors found the transfer of the building to the ROC painful. As a compromise, the ROC offered to give the Protestants a separate room in the church. However, the community considered it impossible. At the same time, Orthodox services in the transferred building are held no more than once a year due to the low interest of the local population. Up to 450,000 euros raised in Europe were invested in the renovation of the Arnau Church, which the local authorities initially refused to hand over, but which was later handed over and converted into an Orthodox church, with the restoration of the ancient paintings interrupted halfway without conservation, the service marks of the restorers removed, the scaffolding dismantled, and the church itself left abandoned for several months.

In May 2010, another 26 objects located on the territory of the Kaliningrad region were transferred to the ownership of the ROC. Many of them had been completely destroyed before. Thus, the ROC became the owner of land plots (in particular, the public garden on Sergeyev Street on the bank of the Lower Pond).

The Kaliningrad Regional Duma passed a law on the transfer of 15 objects to the ownership of the ROC prior to the adoption of the federal law on the transfer of religious property. These include former churches, which are currently occupied by the Kaliningrad Puppet Theatre (formerly the Queen Louise Memorial Church), the organ hall of the Kaliningrad Philharmonic (formerly the Catholic Church of the Holy Family), the House of Culture, a folk instrument orchestra, and a vocational school. All the buildings have been restored and are located in the city center. According to a representative of the Kaliningrad Diocese of the Russian Orthodox Church, all cultural organizations will remain in their place. According to Nikolai Tsukanov, the governor of the Kaliningrad region, the decision to transfer these buildings to the ROC was dictated by the desire to "preserve this property for the residents of the Kaliningrad region," since, in his opinion, after the federal law came into force, they would have to be given to foreigners, who, in his opinion, would be unlikely to maintain museums in them. He also refers to the fact that the ROC is "the basis of statehood" and to verbal agreements that would allegedly allow the property to be taken back from the ROC if the laws were changed.

For many years, the Catholic community has been demanding that the building of the Svyatoy Semejstvo church be handed over to them, with the guarantee that the Philharmonic could continue to work there, but the Kaliningrad authorities refused. In addition, the list of objects transferred to the ROC included the ruins of five German castles. As the head of the diocesan property department Viktor Vasiliev argued for their transfer, "each of them was once a military-monastic complex. In each castle there were chapels and even churches where priests held services". Konstantin Polyakov, vice-chairman of the region's Duma, defended the transfer of the properties on the grounds that there was already enough space for non-Orthodox, whereas "the proportion of Orthodox population in our country is 99%".

Several protests against the transfer of German historical monuments to the Russian Orthodox Church took place in Kaliningrad in the fall of 2010. They were part of a wave of protests that took place in the region in 2009–2010.

== Museum objects, archival documents and restitution and property transferred to theaters ==
Museum objects and archival documents are not subject to the Law of 2010. The procedure of transfer of museum objects and archival documents is regulated by the Decree of the Government of the Russian Federation of 30 June 2001. The Decree of the Government of the Russian Federation dated 21 April 2011 amended the Decree of the Government of the Russian Federation dated 30 June 2001 and was fully devoted to the transfer of museum and archival materials to religious organizations. In particular, it was established that the transfer agreement may be terminated if the transferred materials are stored in violation of federal legislation.

There have also been difficulties with the return of property transferred to theaters, such as bells. Metropolitan Cornelius of the Russian Orthodox Old-Rite Church said in 2020 that the authorities agreed to return to the Old Believers the bells that had been taken from the Old Believers' church in Gavrikov Lane and transferred to the Bolshoi Theater only if the religious organization made exact copies of these bells at its own expense and transferred them to the state.

== Number of properties transferred to religious institutions ==
In 1995–2010, the transfer of real estate to religious organizations in Russia was slow. In December 1995 there were 12,107 religious monuments in the state register, and in 2010 – 11,001 religious monuments. Thus, in 15 years (from 1995 to 2010) about 1.1 thousand religious buildings were transferred to religious organizations all over Russia, or 9.1% of their total number in state ownership in 1995.

According to Alexander Soldatov, editor-in-chief of the portal-credo.ru, by 2018 the Russian Orthodox Church had received no more than a thousand buildings (out of 20,000 available to the Russian Orthodox Church) under Federal Law No. 327. Taking into account the buildings transferred in 1995–2010, about 80% of the pre-revolutionary religious monuments, which it had in 1995, remained in the ownership of the state.

== Expenses for the restoration of destroyed religious buildings prior to their transfer to religious organizations ==
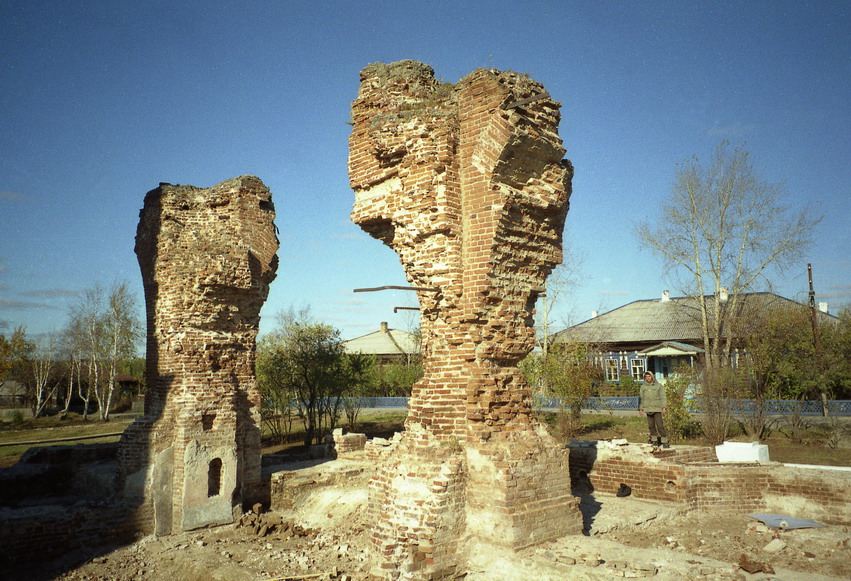
St. Michael the Archangel Church in Merkushino (Sverdlovsk Oblast), blown up during the Soviet period (view in 2001). Restored in the 2000s

Restoring the pre-revolutionary buildings to be transferred was problematic. Many nationalized buildings of pre-revolutionary construction were dilapidated, in disrepair, or even in ruins. For example, all the buildings transferred to believers in Primorsky Krai by 2017 were in poor condition at the time of transfer. After the transfer by 2017, there was not a single case in Primorsky Krai where the new user worsened the condition of the object transferred to him earlier.

In the late 80's and early 90's the buildings were handed over to the worshippers in their original condition. Only the Decree of the President of the Russian Federation dated 23 April 1993 and its Supplementary Provision No. 490 dated 30 June 2001 obliged the owner of the transferred building to carry out a number of restoration and repair works before the transfer. Prior to the issuance of these documents, the object was transferred to the religious community in its present condition, and the community undertook the obligation of its restoration at its own expense. In some cases, the religious community had to pay the authorities for the relocation of the secular institution that occupied the religious building to be moved. For example, the Lutheran community undertook to pay 500 thousand dollars for the relocation of the Museum of the Red Banner Pacific Fleet from the building of the church in Vladivostok (the building itself, according to the official conclusion, was worn out by 65–70%).

As Hegumen Philip (Simonov) noted in 2011: "I guarantee you that most of the objects mentioned in Law 327, which is sometimes called the 'Law on Restitution,' are in such a state that the budget has a lot to do there. <...> Where there's no roof, there's something else. And this is where all sorts of processes begin (including double taxation) that must be resolved not by the state, but by the Church, in order to bring these ruins into a godly state. This is not restitution! Restitution is when you are given everything in a repaired state, a certificate of ownership, and let's work there. In this case they are simply shifting onto the shoulders of the church people those tasks which the state has failed to accomplish".

== See also ==
- The Economic Activities of the Russian Orthodox Church
- List of icons transferred to the Russian Orthodox Church from Museums of the Russian Federation
- List of Church buildings returned to the Russian Orthodox Church
