= Ivan Oseledets =

Russian mathematician

- Born: July 6, 1983 (age 43); Moscow, Soviet Union
- Education: Moscow Institute of Physics and Technology
- Known for: Tensor trains
- Awards: Honorary Professor of the RAS; Humboldt Prize
- Scientific career
- Fields: Machine learning Numerical algorithms
- Workplaces: Skolkovo Institute of Science and Technology
- Doctoral advisor: Evgeny Tyrtyshnikov

Ivan Oseledets (Russian: Оселедец Иван Валерьевич; born July 6, 1983) is a Russian computer scientist and mathematician and professor at the Skolkovo Institute of Science and Technology. He is best known for the tensor train decomposition, which is more commonly called a matrix product state in the area of tensor networks.

Oseledets joined the Skolkovo Institute of Science and Technology in 2013 and currently serves as the director of the centre for artificial intelligence technology.

== Education ==
Oseledets was educated in Russia, receiving an M.Sc from the Moscow Institute of Physics and Technology in 2006, and a Ph.D. from the G.I. Marchuk Institute of Numerical Mathematics of the Russian Academy of Sciences in 2007. He received the Russian Doctor of Sciences in 2012 also from the G.I. Marchuk Institute of Numerical Mathematics of the Russian Academy of Sciences.

== Honors and awards ==
On February 7, 2019, Russian President Vladimir Putin presented Oseledets with an award for, proposing breakthrough computational technology for solving multidimensional problems in physics, chemistry, biology, and data analysis based on tensor expansions.

In April 2022, Oseledets was elected to receive the honorary title, Professor of the Russian Academy of Sciences.

Oseledets received a Humboldt Prize from the Alexander von Humboldt Foundation. The starting date of the award was February 2022.

== Early life and family ==
Ivan Oseledets comes from a family of mathematicians. His grandfather, Ivan Bezhaev, was associate professor at the Moscow State University and reached the rank of lieutenant general in the Soviet Union's Red Army where he was responsible for various mathematical projects involving cryptography. His father, Valeriy Oseledets, proved Oseledets theorem in ergodic systems theory. He is married to a fellow mathematician Ekaterina Muravleva and has a daughter (born around 2011).
