= Vsevolod Chaplin =

Russian priest (1968–2020)

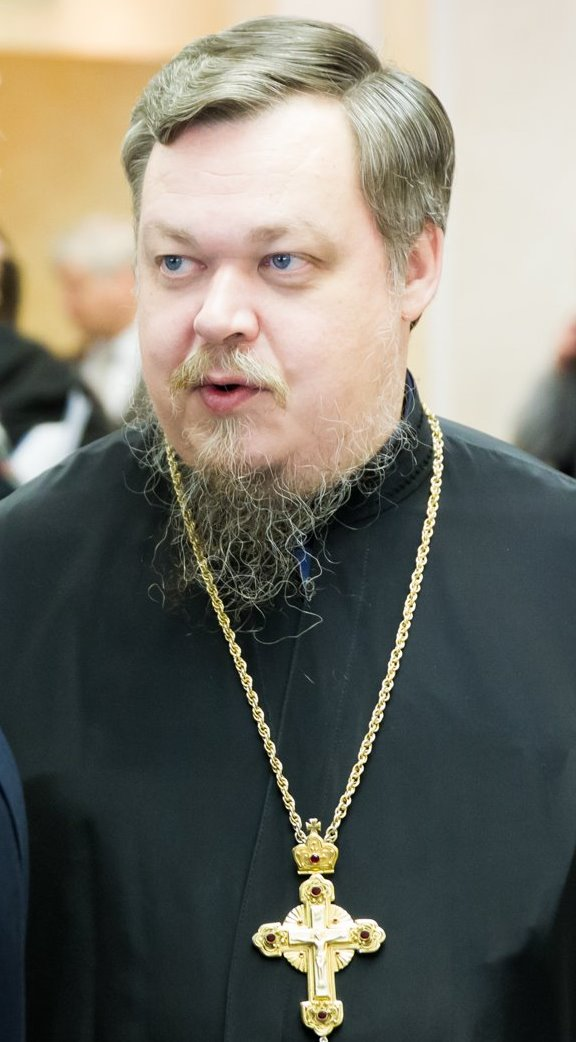
Vsevolod Chaplin, 2014

Vsevolod Anatolyevich Chaplin (Russian: Всеволод Анатольевич Чаплин; 31 March 1968 – 26 January 2020) was a Russian celibate priest of the Russian Orthodox Church (Moscow Patriarchate). He was the chairman of the Synodal Department for the Cooperation of Church and Society of the Moscow Patriarchate from 2009 to December 2015.

Chaplin was a member of the Civic Chamber of the Russian Federation and rector of St. Nicholas on the Three Hills Church, Moscow. He was also deputy head of the World Russian People's Council until 29 December 2015.

According to opinion polls, Chaplin was the most recognizable person in the Russian Orthodox Church, after the Patriarch Kirill (data from 2013 year) and had a mass media reputation of an ultra-conservative cleric.

== Biography ==
Vsevolod Anatolyevich Chaplin was born on 31 March 1968 to the family of an agnostic professor of radio engineering Anatoly Chaplin in Moscow. He attended school in Golyanovo, Moscow.

After he finished secondary education in 1985, he joined the staff of the Publishing Department of the Moscow Patriarchate. On recommendation of Metropolitan Pitirim, he entered the Moscow Theological Seminary, graduating in 1990.

From October 1990 to March 2009, he was in the Department for External Church Relations (DECR) of the Moscow Patriarchate, beginning as an ordinary staffer (1990–1991) before moving into public affairs (1991–1997), then being secretary (1997–2001) and vice-president (2001–2009). At the same time as being in the DECR, he continued studies at the Moscow Theological Academy, defending his thesis and graduating in 1994.

He was ordained to the diaconate on 21 April, 1991, and to the priesthood on 7 January, 1992. He was elevated to archpriest in 1999. In 2009 he was appointed chairman of the newly created synodal department for the Cooperation of Church and Society of the Moscow Patriarchate.

On 24 December 2015, by the decision of the Holy Synod he was released from this position of head of the Department for the Cooperation of Church and Society, the latter being merged with the Information Department headed by Vladimir Legoyda. Chaplin was also removed from the Interconfessional Council of Russia.

Shortly after his dismissal, Chaplin gave a series of interviews which were sharply critical of Patriarch Kirill who he said would "not last much longer". In March 2017, he described people who fled to the West as traitors and expressed support for the killing of "traitors". He died suddenly in Moscow.

== Committees ==
In addition to his other work, Fr. Vsevolod was a member of:

- The Council for Cooperation with Religious Associations under the President of Russia on 4 March 1996, 14 May 1997 and 28 May 2009
- The Central Committee of the World Council of Churches
- The Conference of European Churches
- The WCC Commission on International Affairs
- The Expert Council under the Committee of the State Duma on affairs of public associations and religious organizations
- The expert group the OSCE on Freedom of Religion or Belief
- 31 March 2009: Chairman of the Synodal Department for the newly formed relationship between the Church and society
- 4 January 2010, 21 August 2012: Member of the Russian Organizing Committee "Victory"
- 26 July 2010: Member of the Patriarch's Council of Culture
- 22 May 2009: Vice-chairman of the World Russian People's Council

== Public statements ==
Fr Vsevolod's role as Chairman of the Department for the Cooperation of Church and Society meant that he made public statements on religion and ethics, including:

- Opposing the confusion of the terms 'religion' and 'denomination', claiming that confessions can be just Christian.
- Advocating the establishment of 'Orthodox National Teams'
- Opposing euthanasia
- Opposing the anonymity of the Internet
- Criticised Darwin's doctrine on the origin of man
- Criticised idea that faith is a private matter
- Refuses to pray with Christians of other denominations
- Considers that, to avoid rape, Russian girls need to be 'more serious in appearance'. Proposed that a 'nationwide dress code' could help.
- Stated that female genital mutilation was not necessary for Orthodox women.
- Supports the beautification of church buildings, iconostases, ornaments and vestments, as befits a religion at the centre of national life, giving the Church the opportunity to speak to rich and poor alike.
- Against crimes of the Soviet Bolsheviks
- Against homosexuality and pedophilia
- His statement made on 30 September 2015, in which he, while talking about the support of the Russian military intervention in the Syrian Civil War on the part of all the religious groups in Russia, referred to the fight against terrorism as a "moral fight, a holy fight if you will", was thought to have provoked a harsh reaction from an Islamist forces spokesman in Syria as well as dismay on the part of some Christian leaders in Syria.

== Relationship with Patriarch Kirill ==
Vsevolod Chaplin was one of the closest and loyal people of Kirill for many years, said the former Patriarch Alexy II, congratulating him with the birthday in 2008 year. They both were the main developers of The Basis of the Social Concept of the Russian Orthodox Church. The Australian Broadcasting Corporation called Chaplin in 2014 "Patriarch Kirill's right-hand man".

== Awards ==
=== State awards ===
- The Order of Friendship (21 January 2009) – for outstanding contribution to the development of spiritual culture and strengthening friendship between peoples.
- Diploma of the Russian Federation President (20 July 2011) – for services to the development of spiritual culture and strengthening friendship between peoples.

=== Church awards ===
- The Order of Holy Prince Daniel of Moscow, second class (2010)
- The Order of St. Innocent, Metropolitan of Moscow (2005)
- The Order of Holy Prince Daniel of Moscow, third class (1996)
- The Order of St. Sergius of Radonezh, third class (2013)

–

=== Other awards ===
- The medal "For peace and harmony between peoples" (International Federation for Peace and Harmony, 2007) – for their active participation in the peace, charity, peace and mutual understanding, cooperation among peoples and for strengthening relations and fruitful cooperation between the regional diocesan and secular non-governmental organizations
- The Order of the Russian Imperial House St. Anne's II degree
- Commemorative Medal "The highest visit to Kiev – the mother of Russian cities. 1911–2011" (The Russian Imperial House, 2011)
- Commemorative Medal "The highest visit to the Crimea. 2011" (the Russian Imperial House, 2011)

== See also ==
- Andrey Kuraev
