= Oganov =

Oganov (Russian: Оганов) is a masculine surname of Armenian origin, its feminine counterpart is Oganova. Notable people with the surname include:

- Artem R. Oganov (born 1975), Russian-American chemist, physicist, and materials scientist
- Victor Oganov (born 1976), Russian boxer
