= Albert Nasibulin =

Albert G. Nasibulin
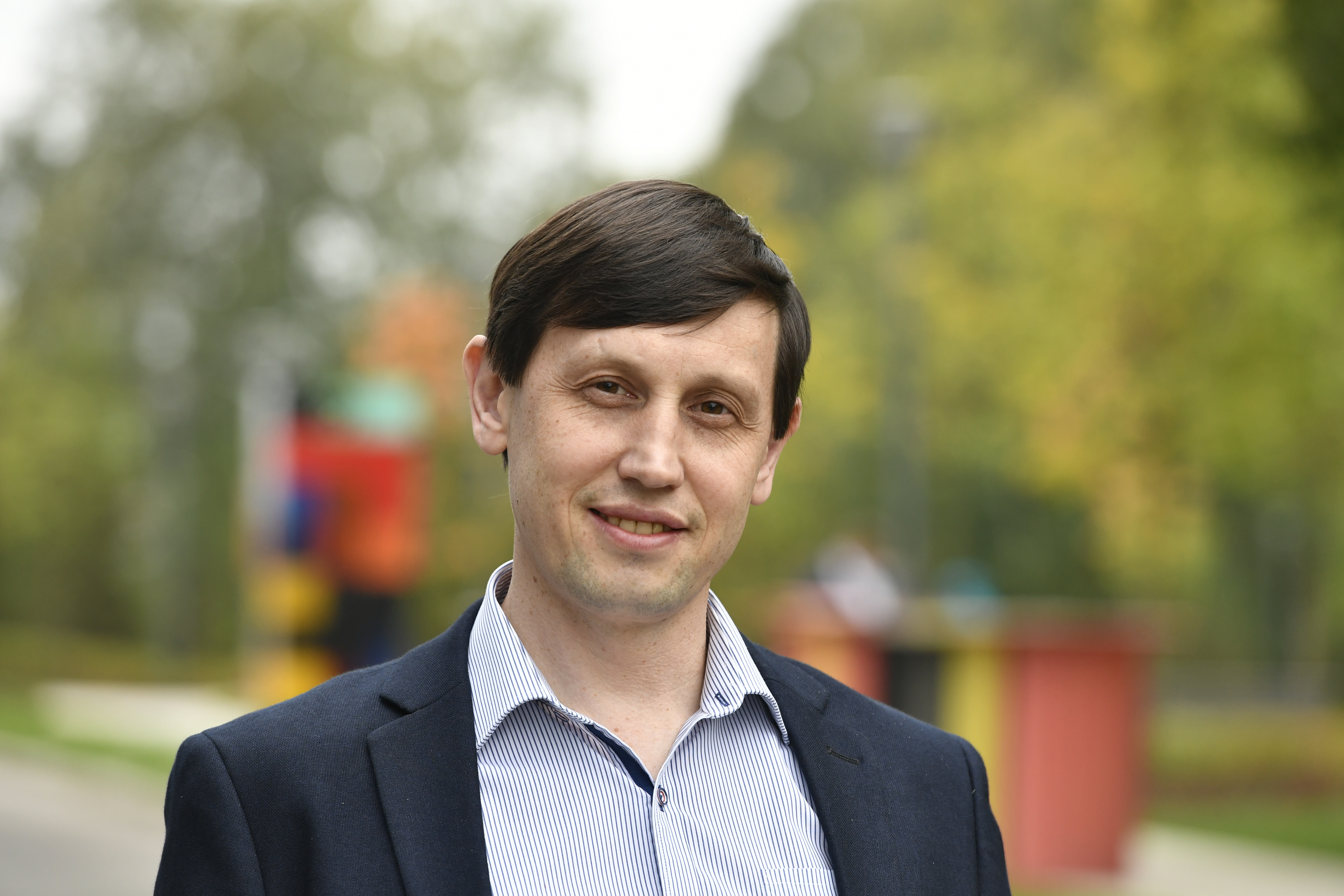
- Born: March 23, 1972 (age 54); Novokuznetsk, USSR
- Citizenship: Russia
- Education: Kemerovo State University
- Awards: FAAR award, Smoluchowski award, Petryanov gold medal
- Scientific career
- Fields: physical chemistry, material science
- Workplaces: Skoltech, Aalto University (till 2022)

Albert Galiyevich Nasibulin (Russian: Альбе́рт Гали́йевич Насибу́лин, born 23 March 1972 in Novokuznetsk city, Kemerovo Region, USSR) is a Russian material scientist recognized for the contributions to synthesis of nanoparticles and carbon nanotubes. He is a professor at Skolkovo Institute of Science and Technology (Moscow, Russia).

== Career ==
Nasibulin graduated from the Chemical Department of Kemerovo State University (KemSU, Russia) in 1994. He earned the degrees of Candidate of chemical sciences (1996, KemSU) and Doktor nauk in technical sciences (2011, St.-Petersburg State Technical University, Russia).

From 1999 to 2014, he worked in Finland: until 2002 he was a senior researcher at the VTT Technical Research Centre of Finland (Finnish: Teknologian tutkimuskeskus VTT Oy), and since 2003 a senior scientist, docent and adjunct professor at the Department of Applied Physics of Helsinki University of Technology (current name: Aalto University, Finnish: Aalto-yliopiston teknillinen korkeakoulu). In 2006-2011, he received an Academy Fellow position from the Academy of Finland.

In 2014, Nasibulin returned to Russia and joined the Skolkovo Institute of Science and Technology (Skoltech). Now he is a professor at the Center for Photonic Science and Engineering of the Skoltech and a head of the Laboratory of Nanomaterials. Until 2022, he held an adjunct professorship at Aalto University.

== Research activities ==
Nasibulin specialises on synthesis of nanomaterials (carbon nanotubes, nanoparticles and nanowires), investigation of their growth mechanisms and applications. He is known for the original aerosol CVD methods of the synthesis of multi-walled and single-walled CNTs. Nasibulin developed a dry transfer technique to prepare conductive, flexible and transparent coating for ITO replacement and freestanding single-walled CNT films to fabricate the state-of-the-art key components for several high-impact application areas. He proposed a method for rapid and controlled synthesis of metal oxide nanowires.

Nasibulin is a co-founder of three companies: Canatu Ltd. (spin-off from Helsinki University of Technology) and CryptoChemistry and Novaprint (spin-offs from Skoltech). He chaired several conferences and served as expert or reviewer for various journals and national/international scientific programs.

== Awards ==
- 2010: FAAR (Finnish Association for Aerosol Research) award for Excellent work in Aerosol Science at International Aerosol Conference in Helsinki, Finland.
- 2011: Smoluchowski award for the contribution to field of "Aerosol synthesis and mechanistic investigations of carbon nanotubes" at European Aerosol Conference in Manchester, UK.
- 2017, 2019, 2020, 2021, 2022, 2024: The Best Professor of SkolTech in various nominations.
- 2018: Honorary title of the Professor of the Russian Academy of Sciences.
- 2019: Gold medal named after academician I. V. Petryanov for outstanding achievements in the field of physical and applied chemistry.
