= Nasibulin =

Nasibulin is a Tatar surname. Notable people with the surname include:

- Albert Nasibulin (born 1972), Russian scientist
- Ruslan Nasibulin (born 1981), Russian fencer
- Vladyslav Nasibulin (born 1989), Ukrainian footballer
