= Natalia Berloff =

Russian mathematician

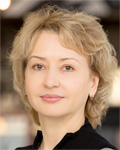
- Born: Orenburg
- Education: Ph.D. (1996)
- Alma mater: Moscow State University (1991)
- Scientific career
- Fields: Mathematics

Natalia G. Berloff is a Russian professor of applied mathematics at the University of Cambridge. She is interested in fluid dynamics, particularly superfluidity and the dynamics of quantum fluids. Her research includes the use of polaritons to simulate structures such as the classical XY model.

== Early life and education ==
Berloff grew up in Russia. She earned her undergraduate degrees of BS (1991) and MS (1992) from Lomonosov Moscow State University. She earned her Ph.D. from Florida State University in 1996, under the supervision of Louis Norberg Howard.

== Career ==
Berloff was a UC President's Research Fellow in the Department of Mathematics of the University of California, Los Angeles from 1997 to 1999, and continued there as PIC Assistant Professor from 1999 to 2002, when she became a Fellow of Jesus College, Cambridge, and a faculty member in the Department of Applied Mathematics and Theoretical Physics at Cambridge, where she is now Professor in Applied Mathematics. Berloff is the principal investigator of the Pi-computing team. Berloff describes herself as a fluid dynamicist, and she is interested in describing the dynamics of physical systems, such as quantum fluids, superfluidity, and Bose-Einstein condensate. Her research includes the use of polaritons to simulate structures such as the classical XY model.

From 2013 to 2016 Berloff took a leave of absence from Cambridge to serve as a Professor and Director of Photonics and Quantum Materials Program at the Skolkovo Institute of Science and Technology in Russia.

In 2005 Berloff was awarded the Pilkington Prize by the Cambridge Centre of Teaching and Learning.
