= Evgeny Tyrtyshnikov =

Russian mathematician

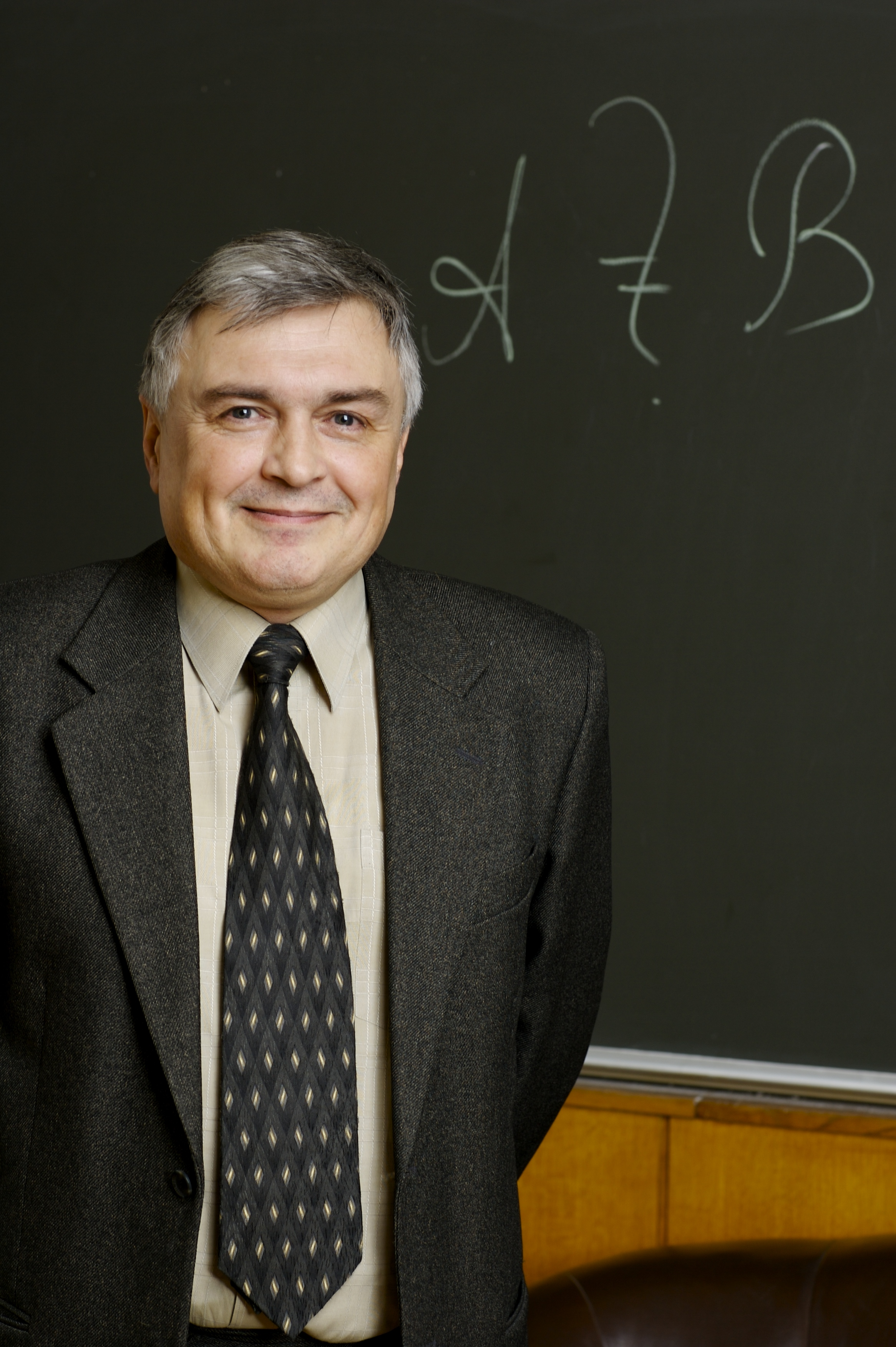
- Born: 2 June 1955 (age 71); Moscow
- Education: Full Member RAS (2016)
- Alma mater: Moscow State University (1977)
- Scientific career
- Fields: Mathematics
- Workplaces: MSU CMC
- Doctoral advisor: Valentin Voevodin; Alexey Sveshnikov
- Doctoral students: Ivan Oseledets

Evgeny Tyrtyshnikov (Russian: Евге́ний Евге́ньевич Тырты́шников) (born 1955) is a Russian mathematician, Dr.Sc., Professor, Academician of the Russian Academy of Sciences, a professor at the Faculty of Computer Science at the Moscow State University.

He graduated from the faculty MSU CMC (1977). Has been working at Moscow State University since 2004.

He defended the thesis "Matrices of the Toeplitz type and their applications" for the degree of Doctor of Physical and Mathematical Sciences (1990).

Was awarded the title of Professor (1996), Corresponding Member of the Russian Academy of Sciences (2006), Academician of the Russian Academy of Sciences (2016).

Author of 12 books and more than 130 scientific articles.

Research interests: linear algebra and its applications, asymptotic analysis of matrix spectra, integral equations of mathematical physics, computational methods.

== Bibliography ==
- Evgeny Grigoriev (2010). Faculty of Computational Mathematics and Cybernetics: History and Modernity: A Biographical Directory (1 500 экз ed.). Moscow: Publishing house of Moscow University. pp. 205–206. ISBN 978-5-211-05838-5.
