= Artem Oganov =

Russian crystallographer and scientist (born 1975)

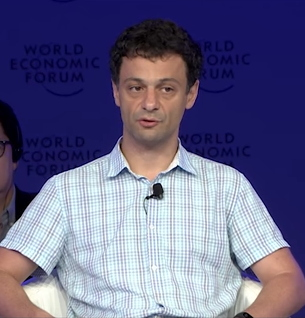
- Oganov in 2017
- Born: Artem R. Oganov; 3 March 1975 (age 51); Moscow, Soviet Union
- Education: Moscow State University (1997); University College London
- Known for: crystal structure prediction high-pressure chemistry computational mineral physics methods of computational materials discovery
- Awards: Russian Highly Cited Researcher Award ETH Latsis Prize, European Mineralogical Union Research Excellence Medal Member of Academia Europaea Fellow of the Royal Society of Chemistry Fellow of the American Physical Society Fellow of the International Core Academy of Sciences and Humanities
- Scientific career
- Fields: Crystallography; Physics; Chemistry; Materials Science
- Workplaces: Stony Brook University; Moscow Institute of Physics and Technology; Skolkovo Institute of Science and Technology

Artem R. Oganov (born 3 March 1975) is a Russian theoretical crystallographer, mineralogist, chemist, physicist, and materials scientist. He is known mostly for his works on computational materials discovery and crystal structure prediction, studies of matter at extreme conditions, including matter of planetary interiors.

== Education ==
Oganov graduated from Moscow State University in 1997 with magna summa cum laude and diploma in Crystallography and Crystal Chemistry. In 2002 he obtained a PhD degree in Crystallography from University College London, and in 2007 got a Habilitation degree from ETH Zurich.

== Career ==
In 2008–2017 he was a professor at Stony Brook University. In 2012 Oganov received the "1000 talents" professorship in China. In 2013, having won a megagrant awarded by the Russian Government, Oganov opened a laboratory at Moscow Institute of Physics and Technology. Since 2015 he is a Professor (since 2024 - Distinguished Professor) at Skolkovo Institute of Science and Technology.

== Awards and honours ==
He is a laureate of several prestigious awards, including an ETH Latsis Prize, Research Excellence Model of the European Mineralogical Union. In 2012, Oganov won a "1000 talents professor" title in China and in the same year became a Professor Honoris Causa of Yanshan University (China), in 2013 elected Fellow of the Mineralogical Association of America, In 2016 and 2017 he was named as one of the most cited Russian scientists in Chemistry and Physics, respectively. In 2022, 2024 and 2025 he was included in the list of Highly Cited Researchers (Clarivate). He was elected a Fellow of the International Core Academy of Sciences and Humanities in 2024., in 2025 becoming a member of its Academic Council.

In 2017 he was awarded the Gamow prize and Concord prize, In 2019, he received the Friendship Award, the highest award given by Chinese government to foreign experts. In 2026 he received the International Science and Technology Cooperation Award of China from Xi Jinping. In 2015 Oganov was elected Professor of the Russian Academy of Sciences., and in 2017 he became a member of the Academy of Europe Academia Europaea, and in 2020 elected Fellow of the Royal Society of Chemistry and Fellow of the American Physical Society. In 2011 he founded the Commission on Crystallography of Materials at the International Union of Crystallography, which he chaired until 2017. In 2017-2020 he served as a member of the Presidential council for science and education. In 2021-2024 he was a chairman of the Department of Semiconductors and Dielectrics of MISIS and head of the newly founded Laboratory of Crystal Chemistry of the Institute of Geochemistry and Analytical Chemistry of Russian Academy of Sciences.

Oganov has held over 10 invited professorships (Universita degli Studi di Milano, Lille'Polytech, University of Paris, University of Poitiers, Chinese University of Hong Kong, Chinese Academy of Sciences, Japan Society for the Promotion of Science, etc.). In 2011, Forbes magazine listed Oganov among "50 Russians who conquered the world". In 2012, highly acclaimed cinema director, Laureate of State Prize Vladimir Gerchikov made a film "The color of a crystal" about Oganov, in 2015 the celebrated TV journalist Leonid Parfenov made a film "Made by Russians" about him. and two other films about him appeared in 2018 on Kultura-TV channel and on NTV channel In 2019, as part of the 150th commemoration of Mendeleev's Periodic Table, yet another film came out, where Oganov is one of the central characters. In 2013, magazines "Russian reporter" and "Expert" have listed Oganov among 100 most influential Russians today.

== Research ==
Oganov has published over 300 peer-reviewed articles (many in top journals, e.g. Nature, Science) and book chapters and 5 patents. He is a coauthor of 3 monographs and the author of 1 popular science book. His works have >48750 citations, h-index 106 (Google scholar, as of November 2026).

His most important works are in fields of computational materials discovery, in particular the effects of pressure on chemical bonding, and state of matter at extreme conditions (e.g. inside the Earth and other planets). He has developed novel and highly efficient methods of crystal structure prediction that became basis of the USPEX code, used by more than 11500 researchers worldwide. Among the highlights are the discovery of the structure of a superhard phase of boron, gamma-B, transparent phase of sodium, new carbon allotrope, prediction of MgSiO_{3} post-perovskite and its stability in the Earth's mantle, prediction of other planet-forming minerals, prediction and synthesis of "forbidden" compounds (e.g., Na_{3}Cl), discovery of helium chemistry, and creation of borophene - a 2D-monolayer of boron atoms, with great promises for future technologies. Oganov has proposed a new scale of electronegativities of the chemical elements.

Extending the definition of electronegativity to high pressures and tabulating electronegativities and chemical hardness for all elements (up to Cm, #96), Oganov and colleagues were able to explain many unusual phenomena of high pressure chemistry, as well as predicting new phenomena and compounds. Prediction of the new high pressure hydrous compound Mg_{2}SiO_{5}H_{2} has inspired a new hypothesis on the origin of the Earth's hydrosphere. Oganov and colleagues have predicted and studied (theoretically and experimentally) a number of novel superconductors, which are among the highest-temperature superconductors known to date: ThH_{10} and ThH_{9}, YH_{6}, (La,Y)H_{6} and (La,Y)H_{10}. Computational methods developed by Oganov open up the way to discovery of materials with desired properties.

== Personal life and family ==
Oganov speaks 5 languages (Russian, English, French, German, and Italian), is married, has four children and is a parishioner of St. Louis Catholic Church in Moscow. His mother is Jewish and his father is Armenian.

== Select interviews and popular science ==
- "Theory and experiment meet, and a new form of boron is found - New York Times"
- "Superharte Form des Elements Bor entdeckt - Spiegel"
- "Chemie Extrem: Forscher bringen Salz aus der Fassung - Spiegel"
- «Newly created helium compound could completely change chemistry - futurism.com»
- «Pressing helium discovery as gas reacted with sodium - Chemistry World»
- «Des cristaux de sel qui sortent de l'ordinaire - La Recherche»
- «La chimie de l'hélium, inconnue sur Terre, pourrait exister dans les planètes géantes - futura-sciences.com»
- «Science et recherche en Russie, en manque d'innovation - rts.ch»
- «Seltsame Bindung eint Natrium und Helium - Spektrum der Wissenschaft»
- "New ordering of the elements could help find materials with desired properties"
- "Neptune et Uranus auraient bien des manteaux de diamant!"
