= Academic ranks in Russia =

Academic ranks in Russia (also called scientific ranks) are the conferred titles, indicating relative importance and power of professors, researchers, and administrative personnel in Russian academia and scientific institutions. The rank “certifies” the demonstrated ability of an individual to function in the specific academic position(s).

== Ranks and scientific hierarchy in Russia ==
With respect to professionals involved in teaching and/or research and employed at the universities/research institutes or in industry, there are three attributes: academic (scientific) rank, academic (scientific) degree, and position.

=== Presently conferred academic ranks ===
In Russia, as of 2018, the scientific ranks of a Docent (Associate Professor) and a Professor (Full Professor) were conferred. Detailed information on the ranks can be obtained – in Russian – on the website of the Higher Attestation Commission which is responsible for conferment in the most cases.

Often, the word “rank” in Russia is overused and incorrectly synonymized with the degrees and positions. However, any terms or titles like “PhD”, "Doktor/Doctor/Доктор" “Academician”, “Dean”, “senior researcher”, etc. are, officially, not ranks – although a mixing sometimes occurs even in documents and is usually tolerated.

As for the degrees in Russia, there are: the first college degree offered is called a Diplom Диплом (Diploma) considered to be approximately equivalent to a Master's Degree). The Russian degrees are a Kandidate Nauk (literally Candidate of Science, now might be considered to be approximately equivalent to American PhD; a Doktor Nauk (literally Doctor of Science, is the highest degree now might be considered to be approximately equivalent to German Doctor habilitatus.

=== Scientific positions in Russia ===
The faculty positions at Russian universities are: Professor (full professor), usually Doktor Nauk; Docent (associate professor), usually Candidate of Science; Senior lecturer (Russian: старший преподаватель) - normally an experienced teacher (>3 years of teaching experience) having completed a Russian Diploma; approximately equivalent to an American undergraduate degree but not necessarily a holder of the Candidate of Science degree; Assistant (ассистент) - entry-level faculty member. Furthermore, there are Technical staff positions: Research technician (техник), lab manager (лаборант), and related personnel are generally not regarded as faculty, most of them are undergraduate or graduate students. As can be deduced, each of the terms “Docent” and “Professor” in Russia has a dual meaning: it is the name of the rank and the position.

To the Administrative positions belong Rector (Russian: ректор); Provost (Russian: первый проректор); Vice-rectors (academic, research, financial, foreign activity); Dean (Russian: декан); Associate deans (academic, research); Chair (head) of a department (Russian: заведующий кафедрой); Head of administrative departments.

In industry and at Research institutes, there is a much larger variety of positions including junior, ordinary, senior, leading, principal researchers, laboratory head, deputy head and many others. Usually senior researcher is a holder of the Candidate of Science degree, leading researcher is a holder of the Doctor of Science degree; principal researcher is usually emeritus position for a holder of the Doctor of Science degree.

=== Importance of the rankings ===
In order to be eligible for the above listed faculty or research positions, the rank is usually not needed, although much depends on the local regulations at the university. Nevertheless, in some cases the rank can help to be selected in a competitive procedure. Furthermore, a holder of the rank can claim higher salary in the same position, than his/her colleagues without the rank.

Oppositely, a degree – at least Candidate of Science – is compulsory for the Docent and an earned Doktor Nauk for the position of Professor, as well as for all the mentioned administrative positions. At the research centers, it is not possible to get promotion above the senior researcher position without a Candidate of Science degree and above the leading researcher without a Doktor Nauk degree; senior researchers without a Candidate of Science degree or leading researchers without a Doktor Nauk degree are exceptional cases after more than 10 years of research work.

Generally, the degree confirms an attained qualification of a scientist, whereas the rank, as already said, merely attests his/her ability to function in the specific position. Therefore, prior to being awarded the Docent or a Professor rank, the person should have been working for some time in a position of a Docent or as a Professor (or in certain research and administrative positions deemed comparable). Below the most typical academic career in Russia is detailed.

== The path toward Professor rank in Russia ==
=== Professorship at the Universities ===
==== From graduation to Associate Professor ====
In Russia the university academic career to the rank of Professor usually starts right after graduation. A Master of Science or a Specialist (a specific Russian form of graduation after 5–6 years of study) can be recruited as an Assistant (lecturer). First echelon universities usually recruit PhDs even to Assistant positions. Assistants have a right to deliver lectures and examine students in all courses except faculty stream courses (with over 50 students from different departments) as well as conduct seminars and laboratory sessions. Assistants also conduct research in their field and directly supervise students' research work.

Usually after 3 or 4 years Assistant completes and defends his PhD thesis. The preparation for the defense includes writing thesis (approximately 150-200 pages), which presents the results of his/her own research work, done under a supervision of a professor. Several papers on the topic should be also published in Russian or peer-reviewed scientific journals accredited by Higher Attestation Commission (VAK), see below. Finally, to be able to defend the thesis one should pass 3 exams: in his field of science, in foreign language and in history and philosophy of science. The defense itself is an official procedure of presenting the thesis to the Dissertation Council – several professors, including two official opponents and the supervisor, who helped the Assistant in conducting his/her research.

After the presentation the professors vote, and decide whether to recommend the dissertant to the degree of Candidate of Science. The right for final decision belongs to the VAK (governmental commission, granting official academic degrees and ranks), but it usually follows the recommendation of the Dissertation Council. In rare cases the dissertant can be called to go through the additional defense in VAK (Russian: ВАК). At last a person is granted with a degree "Candidate of Science" (Russian: кандидат наук), which is a Russian name for a PhD degree.

As soon as the Assistant gets the degree he/she usually goes to the position of Associate Professor (Docent), first without having a docent rank. In order to claim the rank by VAK, as many as 10 scientific papers must be written and some educational materials developed. A holder of the Docent rank has a right to give lectures in all types of courses and to examine students. Most academic careers finish at this stage.

==== From Associate to Full Professor ====
To go further one should write the second thesis, something very close to Habilitation in Germany. The second thesis is a very big research work, which often takes more than 10 years to be completed. The thesis is not limited in volume, but typically is around 300 pages, though some theses exceed 1000 pages. It generally requires fundamental research or a new research direction in a particular field. It can be a summary of the candidate's previous research, but should be of significant scientific, cultural, or social value. Another requirement is to have a large number of publications and a monograph. In some cases a monograph can work as a thesis if not too narrow in research.

The procedure of "defense" is similar, and at the end VAK grants one the degree of Doktor nauk (Russian = доктор наук). With such a degree, the person can fill a position of Full Professor, but, like with the Docent position, first without a rank. To apply for the rank, a number of papers, books and educational works, as well as the number of successful supervisions of PhD students (as prescribed by VAK) are required in addition to the degree. The rank of Professor is exceedingly rarely achieved at the age of less than 40. This rank gives one the right to hold a top faculty position, to be a main examiner, to take part in the university's council, etc. The title "Professor" in Russia means "Full professor".

According to the current regulations, both Associate Professor (Docent) and Full Professor (Professor) ranks are awarded in a specialty, e.g. “Professor in Physical Chemistry”; the list of possible specialties is the same as for dissertations.

=== Professorship at Research institutes ===
People working at the research institutes of the Russian Academy of Sciences or in industry also obtain the Candidate or Doctor of Science degrees. Moreover their research results are often more valuable.

Such professionals can be conferred to the ranks of Docent and Professor in two ways. In principle they can have a part-time second position at some university and get the rank in the same manner as the main university staff members. Otherwise, without being involved in lecturing, they can provide on-place support to research students at different stages and, especially, supervise PhD students directly at their institutions. However, to be eligible for a rank, such a non-lecturing individual must have larger number of the successfully supervised Master works and PhD dissertations, than his/her colleagues really involved in teaching. For example, for the full professor rank, as of today, at least 5 defended PhD students are needed, while only 3 are enough for the university employee.

Until 2013, in order to discern between the "mainly-teaching" and "mainly-doing-research" docents/professors, there existed two kinds of titles in Russia. There was "Docent/Professor by a Chair" (Russian = по кафедре) if the scientist had at least some minimum of teaching hours per semester at this Chair, and "Docent/Professor in a specialty" (Russian = по специальности). However, since 2014, irrespectively of whether the applicant fulfills the "teaching" or "research" requirements, the rank is anyway awarded "in a specialty".

In 2015, the rank of the "Professor of the Russian Academy of Sciences" (RAS) was established. It can be conferred to the holders of the Doctor of Science degree for high scientific achievements, with little regard for teaching activity, if such person is not yet a member of the academy. Otherwise than the "regular" professor title, such a rank is awarded not by VAK but by the Presidium of the RAS. A RAS Professor title can be granted to both holders and non-holders of the regular VAK professor rank. Most RAS professors are employed at the research institutes.

Unlike at the universities, a conferment of the Docent or Professor rank does not enable to occupy some higher position at the Research center. But the rank can be taken into account when fixing the contract and employment terms on a case-by-case basis.

== See also ==
- Academic degree § Russia
- Dissernet
- Higher Attestation Commission
- Doktor Nauk
