= Edward F. Crawley =

American engineering academic

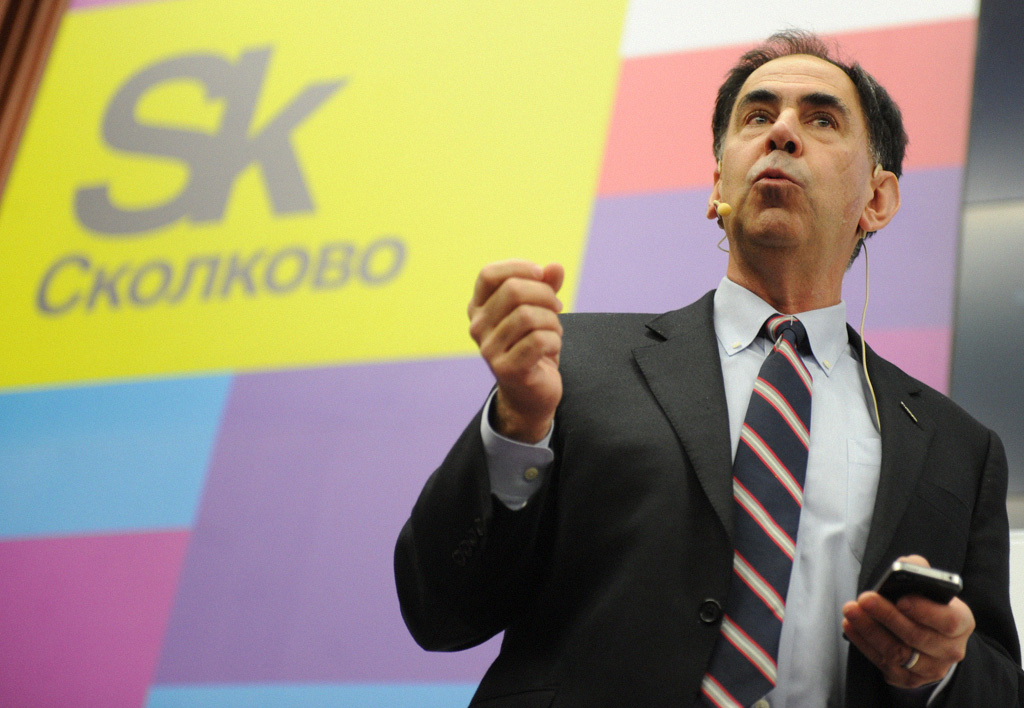
Crawley presenting at Skoltech

Edward F. Crawley (born September 7, 1954) is a Professor of Aeronautics and Astronautics and of Engineering Systems at Massachusetts Institute of Technology. His teaching and research focuses on Space Systems, Systems Architecture and Systems Engineering. He serves as the co-chair of NASA Exploration Technology Development Program Review Committee and formerly served as the Co-Director of the Gordon Engineering Leadership Program at MIT.

In 1998, Crawley was elected as a member into the National Academy of Engineering for contributions to control-structure interaction and its applications on Earth and in space, and to the international space program. In 2011, Crawley was elected as a foreign member into the Chinese Academy of Engineering.

From 2011 to 2016 he was President of Skolkovo Institute of Science and Technology in Skolkovo innovation center. He was on leave from MIT since 2011 and planned to return after leaving the Skolkovo office.

Prof. Crawley earned his S.B. (1976) and an S.M. (1978) in Aeronautics and Astronautics, and an Sc.D. (1981) in Aerospace Structures from MIT. Prof. Crawley was the founding co-director of the MIT System Design and Management graduate program and also the CDIO.

Prof. Crawley is a Distinguished Eagle Scout.https://nesa.org/awards-and-recognition/distinguished-eagle-scout-award/desa-recipients/
