= Skolkovo Institute of Science and Technology =

Technical university in Russia

Coordinates: 55°41′53.46″N 37°21′34.38″E

Skolkovo Skolkovo Institute of Science and Technology Сколковский институт науки и технологий
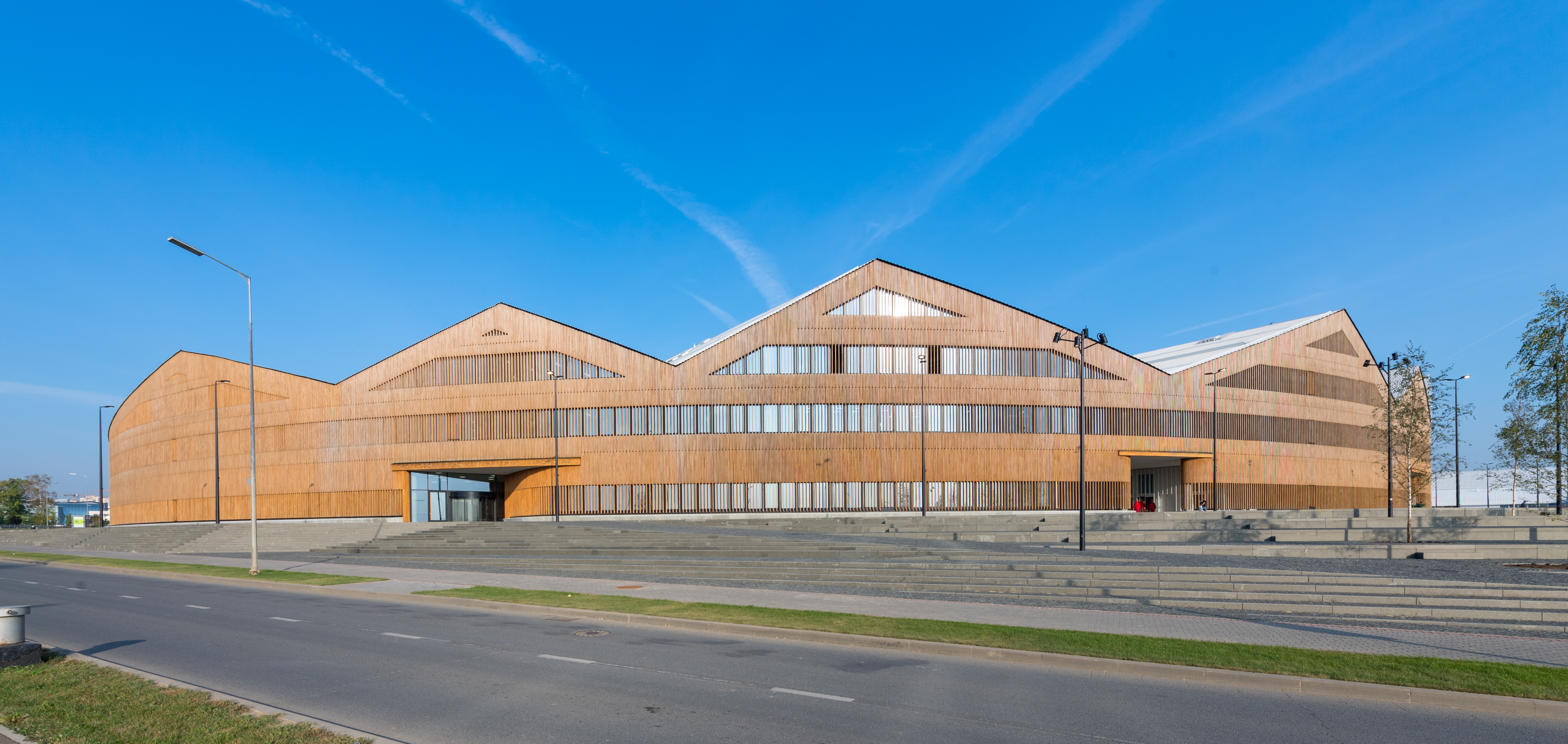
- Type: Private research university
- Established: 2011; 15 years ago
- President: Alexander Kuleshov
- Administrative staff: 1500
- Students: 1028
- Location: Moscow, Russia
- Website: https://www.skoltech.ru/en/

The Skolkovo Institute of Science and Technology, or Skoltech, is a private institute located in Moscow, Russia. Skoltech was established in 2011 as part of a multi-year partnership with the Massachusetts Institute of Technology (MIT) Globally, the university in 2023 was ranked # 702 in the world by US News & World Report. It was among the number 65 young university in the world according to Nature Index in 2021. That same year Skoltech entered the subject ranking in physics among young universities for the first time (35th place), and named a rapidly rising university (21st place among young universities). In February 2022 MIT ended its partnership with Skoltech in protest of the Russian invasion of Ukraine.

== History ==
Skoltech began as a joint effort with a curriculum designed by MIT and financial backing from the Russian government. The school offers graduate degrees only, and teaching is in English. It serves as the centerpiece of a $2.7 billion innovation hub funded by the Russian Finance Ministry. By 2013, the university had hired 30 to 35 professors and established a campus 19 kilometres (12 mi) from the Red Square near Odintsovo. In 2018, it inaugurated a new campus designed by Herzog & de Meuron with an area of 130,000 square metres (1,400,000 sq ft). It is the first work in Russia for the Swiss practice and the result of an international competition. In 2019, the university won the first prize for the Prix Versailles in the "University Campus" category.

The university is also known for designing and operating a petaflop supercomputer, Zhores, considered one of the largest in Russia. In 2020, twenty-three researchers landed on the global top 2% list by citation impact. As a result, by 2021, the university had entered the QS World University Rankings by subject.

MIT terminated the partnership in February 2022 as a response to the 2022 Russian invasion of Ukraine.

== Degree programs ==
Skoltech offers Master of Science (MSc) and Doctor of Philosophy (PhD) degrees in several different areas.

The list of MSc degree programs includes:

Awarded degree	MSc Program
Master of Science in Mathematics and Computer Science	Data Science with two tracks available, Machine Learning and Artificial Intelligence, and Math of Machine Learning.
Master of Science in Advanced Computational Science	Advanced Computational Science
Master of Science in Petroleum Engineering	Petroleum Engineering
Master of Science in Applied Mathematics and Physics	Photonics and Quantum Materials
Master of Science in Applied Mathematics and Physics	Mathematical and Theoretical Physics
Master of Science in Biotechnology	Biotechnology
Master of Science in Information Systems and Technologies	Space and Engineering Systems
Master of Science in Information Systems and Technologies	Energy Systems
Master of Science in Information Systems and Technologies	Advanced and Digital Engineering Technologies
Master of Science in Materials Science and Technology of Materials	Materials Science
Master of Science in Information Technology and Engineering	Computational Science and Engineering
Master of Science in the Internet of Things & Wireless Technologies	Internet of Things and Wireless Technologies

PhD degree programs include:

- Mathematics and Mechanics
- Physics
- Materials Science and Engineering
- Life Sciences
- Computational and Data Science and Engineering
- Engineering Systems
- Petroleum Engineering

== Centers for Research, Education and Innovation (CREIs) ==
The institute's education, research, and innovation activities revolve around Centers for Research, Education and Innovation (CREIs), 5 Project Centers and 1 Center. These centers were developed to advance the aims of pursuing innovative research, delivering scientific growth, and generating world-class educational programs.

- Center for Artificial Intelligence Technology (AI Center)
- Center for Molecular and Cellular Biology (Bio Center)
- Vladimir Zelman Center for Neurobiology and Brain Rehabilitation (Neuro Center)
- Center for Digital Engineering (Engineering Center)
- Center for Petroleum Science and Engineering (Petroleum Center)
- Center for Materials Technologies (Materials Center)
- Center for Photonics Science and Engineering (Photonics Center)
- Center for Engineering Physics (Physics Center)
- Project Center for Next Generation Wireless and IoT (Wireless Center)
- Project Center for Agro Technologies (Agro Center)
- Project Center for Energy Transition and ESG (ESG Center)
- Center for Energy Science and Technology (Energy Center)
- Research Center in artificial intelligence in the direction of optimization of management decisions to reduce the carbon footprint (Applied AI Center)
- Advanced Studies

== Notable faculty ==
- Artem Oganov
- Ivan Oseledets
- Olga Dontsova
- Mikhail Gelfand
- Albert Nasibulin
- Tudor Ratiu
- Stanislav Smirnov

== Leadership ==
- Alexander Kuleshov, President

== Notable alumni ==
- Natalia Berloff, former professor of Photonics, Currently Professor at University of Cambridge
- Edward F. Crawley first President of Skoltech. Currently Professor at Massachusetts Institute of Technology.
