= Allenburg Church =

Coordinates: 54°29′25″N 21°11′47″E

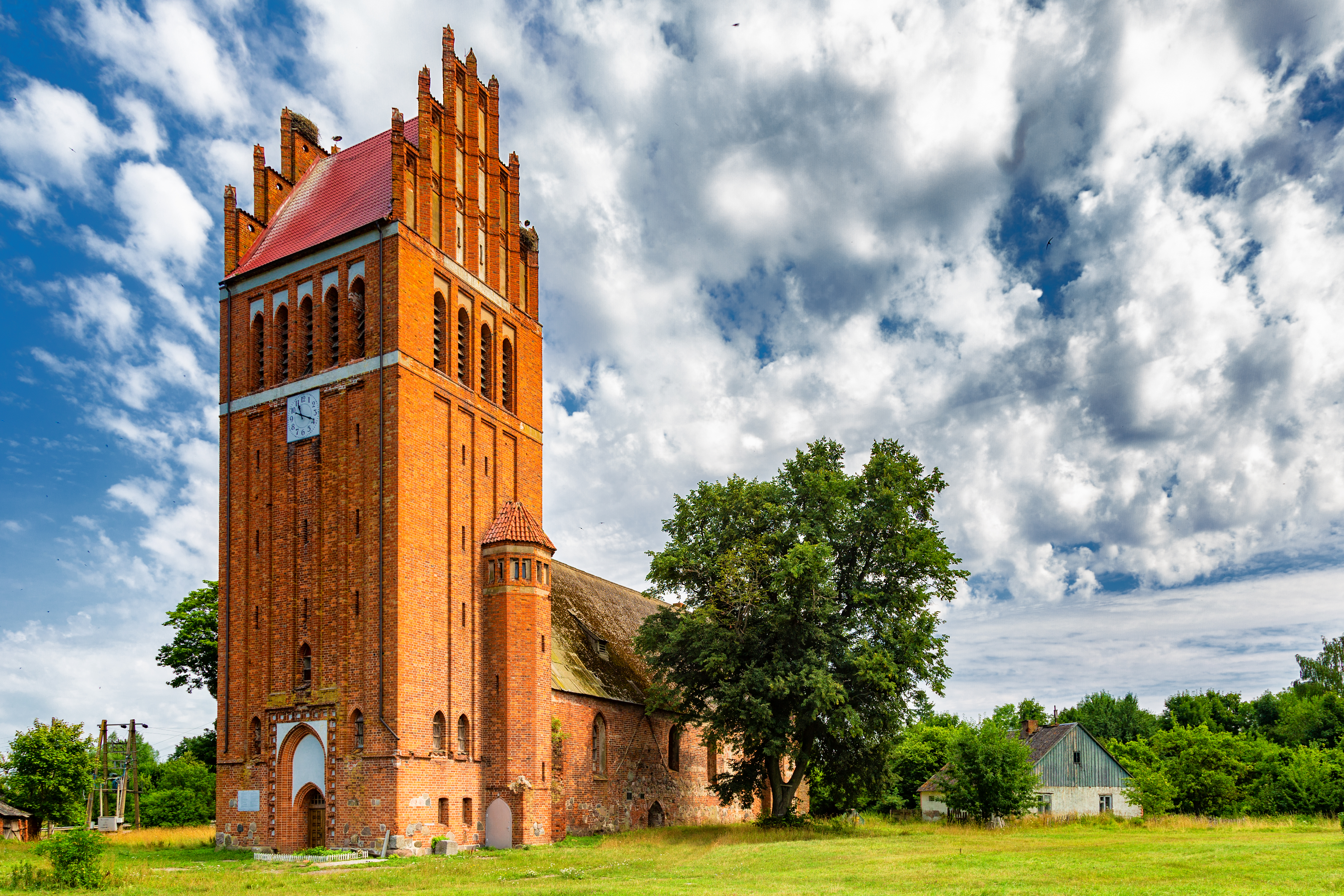
Allenburg Church

The Allenburg Church is a Brick Gothic building near Allenburg Castle commissioned by Konrad von Jungingen, the Grand Master of the Teutonic Knights, in 1405. Seriously damaged during the First World War, the medieval building was restored and slightly expanded in 1925. After the Second World War, Allenburg was renamed Druzhba and is now part of Pravdinsky District of Kaliningrad Oblast. The church was used by local farmers as a grain-drier. It was restored by the local Lutheran community in 2005 and eventually passed to the Russian Orthodox Church in 2010.
