= Vladimir R. Legoyda =

Russian journalist (born 1976)

Vladimir Legoyda
- Владимир Легойда
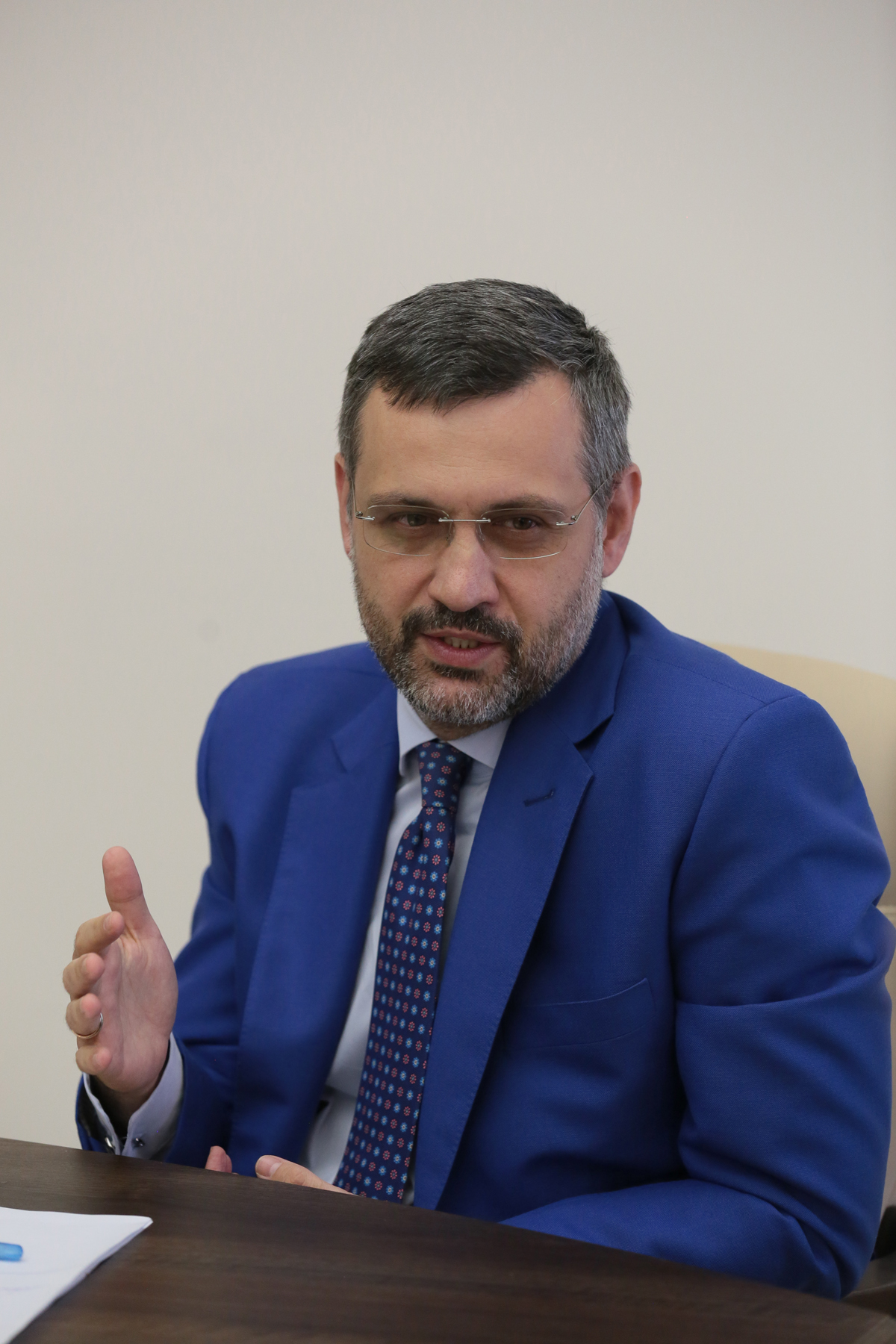
- Legoyda in 2018
- Born: August 8, 1973 (age 52); Kostanay, Kazakhstan SSR

Vladimir Romanovich Legoyda (Russian: Владимир Романович Легойда; born 8 August 1973) is a Russian public figure, journalist, university professor, expert in cultural studies, political science and religious studies. He is Candidate of Political Sciences and professor of the Department of World literature and culture, Moscow State Institute of International Relations; co-founder, editor-in-chief of Foma magazine, Chairman of the Department for Church's Society and Mass Mediа Relations (Russian Orthodox Church) and Acting Head of the Press Service of the Patriarch of Moscow and all Rus'.

== Early life ==
Legoyda was born on 8 August 1973 in Kostanay, Kazakhstan. His father was a policeman and his mother was a teacher. In 1990, he graduated from Kustanai Secondary School No. 10 with a gold medal. In 1996 he graduated from Moscow State Institute of International Relations, School of International Journalism. In 2000, under the scientific supervision of a Candidate of Historical Sciences, Docent Yu. P. Simonov, he defended his dissertation for the degree of Candidate of Political Sciences on the topic "Symbols and rituals in political processes in the USA: traditions and modernity (the phenomenon of “civil religion")" (specialty 23.00.02 – political institutions and processes). In 2005 he was got the academic rank of Docent.

== Career ==
Legoyda works as a lecturer at the institute. In 2007–2009 he headed the Department of international journalism, at the institute. In 2013 Vladimir R. Legoyda became a professor.

== Church activities ==
From 2009 to 2015 Legoyda worked as the Chairman of the Holy Synod Information Department. It was the first time in history when a layman served as Chair of the department.

In 2009, he joined the Holy Synod Biblical-Theological Commission. In 2010, he became a member of the Patriarchal Council for Culture. In 2011 he began serving as Secretary of the Supreme Church Council of Russian Orthodox Church. In 2011 he became a member of the Patriarchal Commission on Family Matters, Protection of Motherhood and Childhood. From 2006 to 2008 he was a member of the working group who prepared the draft "The Russian Orthodox Church's Basic Teaching on Human Dignity, Freedom and Rights".

In 2015 Legoyda began serving as Chair of the Holy Synod Department for Church's Society and Mass Mediа Relations.

11 September 2019 in connection with the decision of Patriarch Kirill to dismiss the head of the press service of the Patriarch of Moscow and all Rus', priest Alexander Volkov, was appointed interim head of this unit.

== Cultural and educational activities ==
Vladimir R. Legoyda is a co-founder of Foma magazine. In 1996 he became its chief editor. In 2006 Legoyda became a member of the editorial board of the theological journal Alpha and omega.

== Social activities ==
From 2009 to 2015 he was a member of the Council under the President of the Russian Federation on development of civil society institutions and human rights. In 2009 he became a member of the Public Council under the Ministry of justice of the Russian Federation. From 2009 to 2012 he was a member of the Public chamber of the Russian Federation (the Commission on communications, information policy and freedom of word in mass media). In 2011 he became a member of the Board of Trustees of the League of Safe Internet. In 2012 he became a member of the Public Council under the Commissioner under the President of the Russian Federation on the rights of the child. In 2012 he became a member of the Council on Public television.

He wrote books and scientific and popular articles on cultural and religious-philosophical themes.

== Personal life ==
He is married with two daughters and one son.

== Books ==
- Декларация зависимости. — М.: «Никея», 2011. — 192 с.
- Мешают ли джинсы спасению. Опыт современной апологетики. — 3-е изд., испр. и доп. — М.: Фома-Центр, «Даръ», 2007. — 384 с. (1-е изд. — М.: Фома-Центр, 2005; 2-е изд. — М.: Фома-Центр, 2006).
- Человек в шкуре дракона — М.: «Никея», 2015. — 208 с. ISBN 978-5-91761-390-1
- Несколько слов к Рождеству Христову. – М.: «Никея», 2016. — 48 с.
- Сирийский рубеж — М.: Центр анализа стратегий и технологий, 2016. — 153 c.
- Быть отцом! — М.: «Никея», 2017. — 35—57 с.
- Церковь, возвышающая голос: с кем она церковь?, с властью или оппозицией?, с богатыми или бедными?, с консерваторами или либералами?, с кем и почему борется церковь?. – М.: Эксмо, 2018. – 191 с. ISBN 978-5-04-091178-3 : 1500 экз.
