= 2009–2010 Kaliningrad protests =

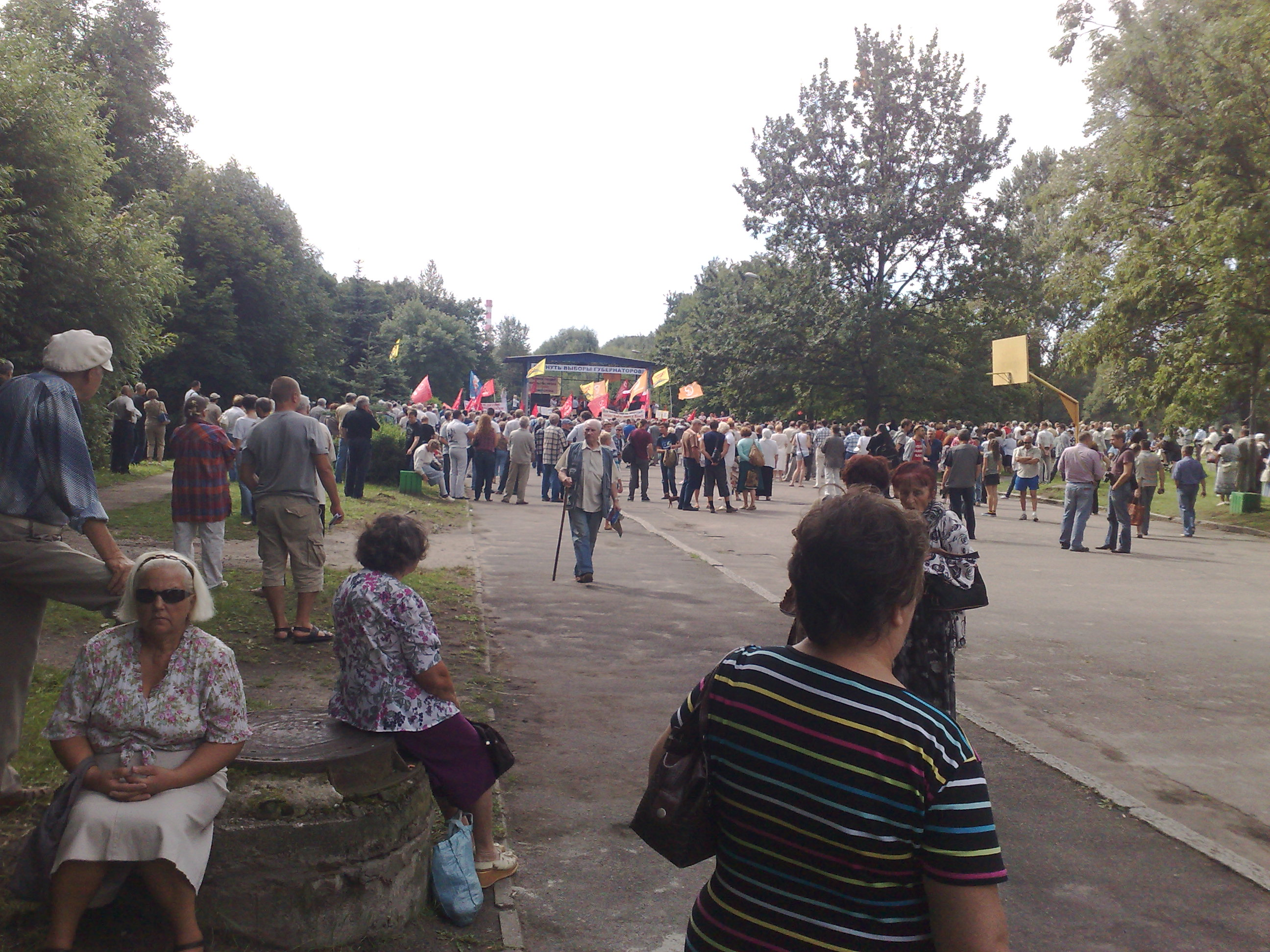
- Opposition protest in Kaliningrad Park on 21 August 2010
- Date: 24 October 2009 – 31 October 2010 (1 year and 1 week)
- Location: Kaliningrad
- Caused by: 25% rise in transportation fares; Workers unpaid and delayed payments
- Goals: Resignation of Prime Minister Vladimir Putin; Resignation of President Dmitry Medvedev; New general elections; Lower transportation tax rate and for workers to be paid more; Resignation of mayor (immediate); Simplification of the visa regime with the European Union
- Methods: Demonstrations
- Result: Protests forcibly suppressed; Local governor resigned

Parties
Russian opposition: Communist Party of the Russian Federation; Left Front; Yabloko; Vanguard of Red Youth; Patriots of Russia; Solidarnost; Our City; Spravedlivost; "For Fair Elections" movement; Baltic Republican Party	Government of Russia: United Russia

Lead figures
Konstantin Doroshok; Andrei Nyrko; Solomon Ginzburg; Sergei Pasko	Dmitry Medvedev; Vladimir Putin; Georgy Boos; Nikolay Tsukanov

The 2009–2010 Kaliningrad protests are social and political events in Kaliningrad, Russia in 2009–2010. Many of them were discussed and commented on in the Russian and foreign media and were named as the cause of a significant public outcry. The protests included pickets and several rallies on October 24, 2009, December 12, 2009, and January 30, 2010. They became a systematic phenomenon.

The first protest rally against the increase in the transport tax within the framework of the All-Russian protest action was held on the square in front of the Mother Russia monument. It was organized by the Spravedlivost public organization, whose leader is Konstantin Doroshok. The rally lasted two hours, about 500 people were present, the action was supported by the Communist Party, the Left Front social movements, the Vanguard of the Red Youth, Solidarity, Our City, and the Patriots of Russia party. Despite protests the Kaliningrad Regional Duma decided to raise the transport tax by an average of 25 percent.

An estimated 3000–5000 people gathered near the monument to Mother Russia. Representatives of parties and social movements made speeches. Following the meeting, a resolution of 11 points was adopted, including the resignation of the regional governor Georgy Boos and the regional Duma deputies from United Russia, on the transport tariff and technical regulations. At the end of the meeting, the central highway of the city, Leninsky Prospekt, was blocked for 40 minutes. The meeting adopted a resolution, sent to the authorities. The response to the demands of citizens was not received within the period established by law (30 days).

The next and final rally was held by around 5000 demonstrators, demanding democracy and democratic reforms, an end to the government, and a decrease in transportation fares. The police were present but didn't intervene in the uprising.

10,000–12,000 workers and peaceful demonstrators protested on 2 February, demanding the resignation of the government and better wages.

Anti-government protests were led by 12,000 protesters. They started on 12 March and ended on 19 March, when the largest and final protest took place.

== See also ==
- 2011-2013 Russian protests
- 2017-2018 Russian protests
