= Publishing Council of the Moscow Patriarchate =

Publishing Council of the Russian Orthodox Church (Russian: Издательский совет Русской православной церкви) is one of the departments of the Holy Synod of the Moscow Patriarchate, in its present form was created in 1994. The task of the Council is to coordinate the activities of the Orthodox publishing organizations, providing methodological, legal, organizational, and other assistance as the ecclesiastical and secular publishers.

== History ==
Back in 1908, at the Missionary Congress in Kiev, Archpriest Ivan Vostorgov stated that "there is absolutely a need to give the people apologetic literature in a publicly available presentation." This proposal was accepted by the entire congress and sent to the Most Holy Synod for consideration. After a rather lengthy discussion, the draft regulations on the Publishing Council were developed, reviewed and adopted at the Synod meeting on March 13, 1913. The draft regulations on the Publishing Council at the Holy Synod were submitted to Emperor Nicholas II for consideration on March 21, 1913 in Tsarskoye Selo. Nicholas II approved the submitted document. The Council consisted of the chairman, who was at the same time a member of the Most Holy Synod, and four permanent members both clerical and lay rank. The Chairman was given the right, as necessary, to invite persons who were known for their works in the literary and publishing business to the Council. The Publishing Council, created a year before the outbreak of the First World War, could not expand its activities to the scale and scope that the initiators of its creation wanted. If the situation had been more prosperous, the Publishing Council would have become the largest church publishing house, not only checking and publishing author's manuscripts, but also ordering the necessary textbooks, manuals, brochures, leaflets for public reading. In addition, it would eventually most likely replace the central spiritual censorship committees in St. Petersburg and Moscow. In the new situation of 1917 the activities of the Publishing Council were ceased.

The publishing department of the Russian Orthodox Church, established on the basis of the adopted in February 1945, at the meeting of Local Council of the Russian Orthodox Church, "Regulations on the Administration of the ROC" At the department was given responsibility for the production of the "Journal of the Moscow Patriarchate," church calendars, scripture, religious literature, manuals for church and clergy, and other books needed for church life. In 1956, the publishing arm for the first time since 1918 issued in the country of the Bible.

Since the early 1990s, the Publishing Department has lost its position as a monopolist in the field of Orthodox book publishing in the territory of the former USSR. Independent Orthodox publishing houses began to appear, the number of which grew rapidly. At the same time, the quality of printing was often low, and the process of Orthodox book publishing became spontaneous, and there was a need to coordinate it. The 1994 Bishops' Council considered the issues and problems facing the Russian Orthodox Church in the field of publishing, and a decision was made: "instead of the Publishing Department of the Moscow Patriarchate, create the Publishing Council of the Moscow Patriarchate as a collegial body consisting of representatives of synodal institutions, theological schools, church publishing houses and other institutions of the Russian Orthodox Church, in order to coordinate publishing activities, evaluate published manuscripts and submit publishing plans for approval by the Holy Synod". Publishing functions that previously lay on the department were assigned to the Publishing House of the Moscow Patriarchate, established on November 24, 1994.

On October 6, 1999 by the decree of the Holy Synod of the Russian Orthodox Church, the Publishing council was given the status of a Synodal Department.

== Literature ==
- Кашеваров, Анатолий (2004). Печать Русской Православной Церкви в XX веке: очерки истории (in Russian). СПб.: Изд-во СПбГУ; Роза мира. ISBN 5-85574-134-6.
- Полищук, Е. С. (2009). "Издательский отдел, Издательский совет, Издательство Московского патриархата". Православная энциклопедия (in Russian). Vol. XXI : «Иверская икона Божией матери — Икиматарий». М. pp. 559–562.
- Преданный служитель Церкви: О церковной и общественной деятельности митрополита Питирима (Нечаева): Сборник трудов и воспоминаний. Издательство Московской Патриархии. 2009. ISBN 978-5-94625-333-8.
- Аксенова Г. В. Издательская политика Московского патриархата: 1960—1980 гг. // У истоков российской государственности. Исследования, материалы. — Калуга, 2017. — С. 158—169.
- Карпук, Дмитрий (2021). "Издательский совет при Святейшем Синоде: обстоятельства учреждения и основные направления деятельности" (PDF). Вестник Исторического общества Санкт-Петербургской Духовной Академии (in Russian) (3 (8)): 214–221.
