= Druzhba, Pravdinsky District, Kaliningrad Oblast =

Druzhba Дружба
- Rural locality
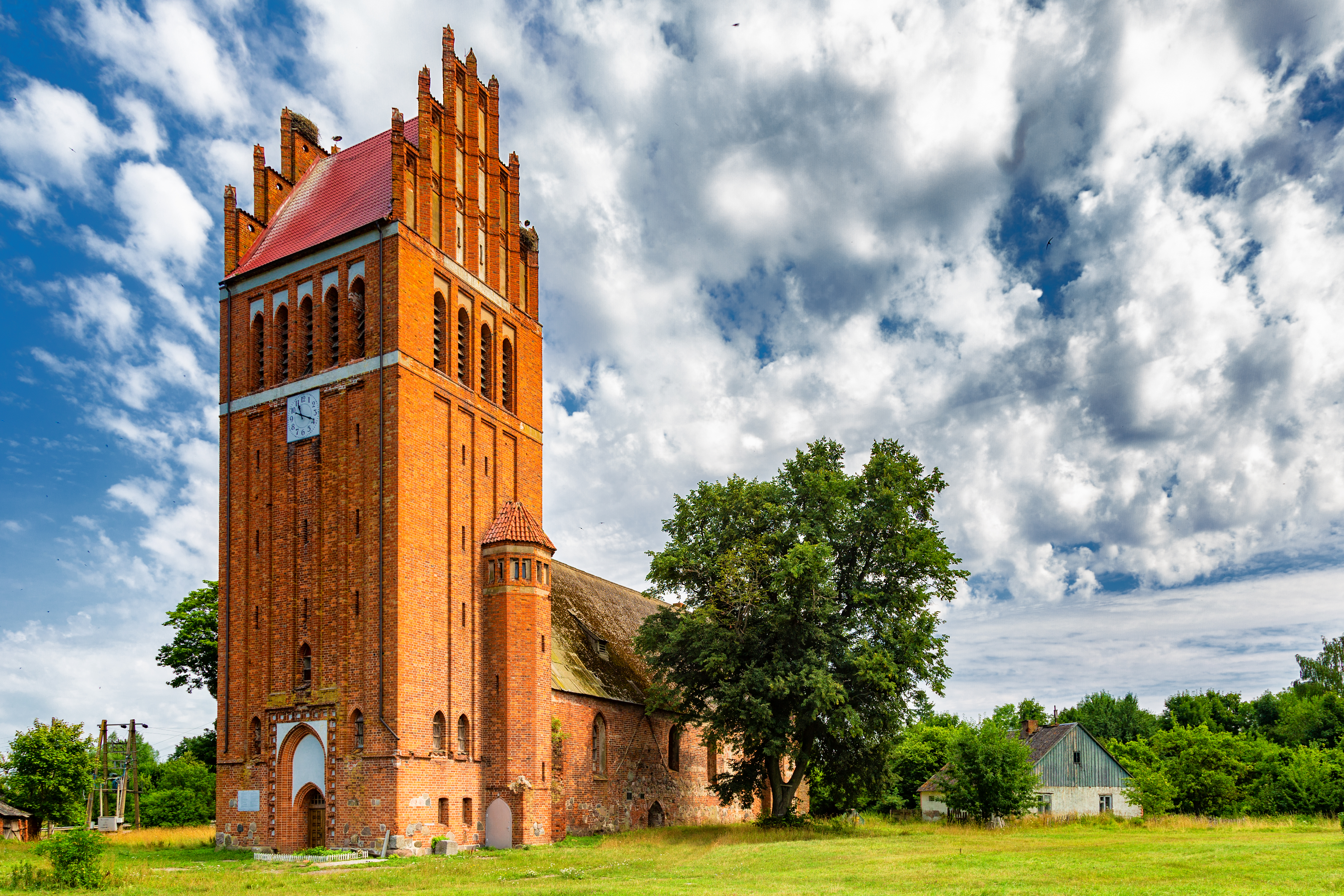
- Gothic church
- Interactive map of Druzhba
- Location of Druzhba Druzhba (European Russia) Druzhba (Russia)
- Coordinates: 54°29′33″N 21°11′32″E
- Country: Russia
- Federal subject: Kaliningrad Oblast
- Administrative district: Pravdinsky District
- Founded: 1256 (Julian)
- Elevation: 27 m (89 ft)

Population (2010 Census)
  - Total: 440
  - Estimate (2010): 440 (0%)
- Time zone: UTC+2 (MSK–1)
- Postal code: 238405
- OKTMO ID: 27719000136

Druzhba (Russian: Дру́жба, German: Allenburg, Polish: Alembork, Lithuanian: Alna) is a rural locality (a village) in Pravdinsky District of Kaliningrad Oblast, Russia, located at the confluence of the Omet and Łyna rivers. Population: 440 (2010 census); 515 (2002 census); 1,750 (1900).

== History ==
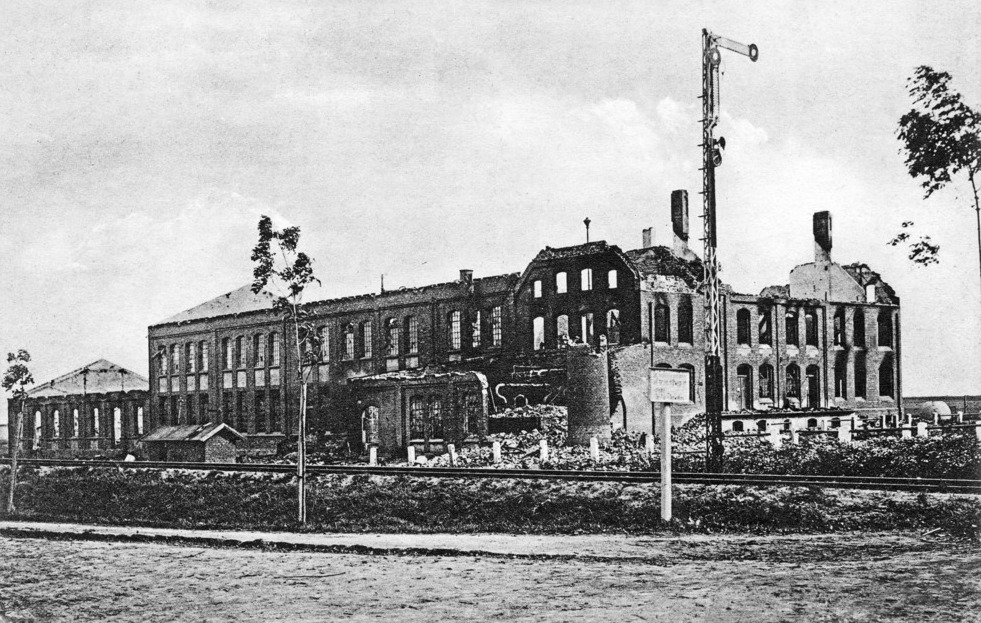
Destroyed factory during World War I

The town was captured by Polish King Władysław II Jagiełło in 1410. In 1440, the town was one of the founding members of the Prussian Confederation, which opposed Teutonic rule, and upon the request of which King Casimir IV Jagiellon incorporated the territory to the Kingdom of Poland in 1454. After the subsequent Thirteen Years' War (1454–1466), it became a part of Poland as a fief held by the Teutonic Knights.

From the 18th century, it formed part of the Kingdom of Prussia. During the Seven Years' War, it was captured by Russia in 1757 and 1758, and then occupied by Russia until 1762. From 1871 it was also part of Germany. The Provincial Sanatorium and Nursing Institution Allenberg was a psychiatric hospital in Allenberg from 1852 to 1940. In the late 19th century, the town had a population of 2,200, and eight annual fairs were held there. After World War II, the town was renamed to Druzhba.

== Sights ==
The local Orthodox church is a medieval Brick Gothic building. There are also two locks of the Masurian Canal in the village.

== Notable residents ==
- Julius Hallervorden (1882–1965), German physician and neuroscientist
