= Doctor of Sciences =

Soviet and Russian degree

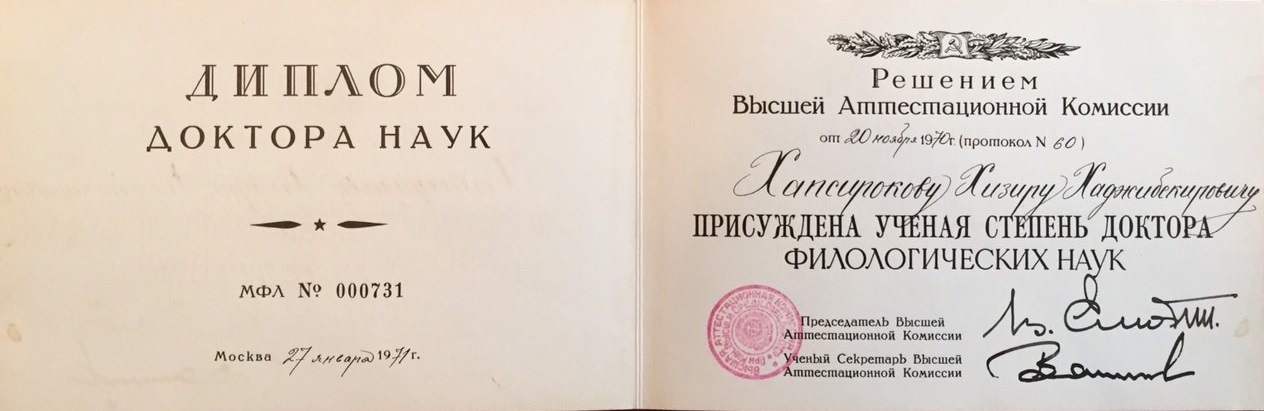
A Soviet Doctor of Sciences certificate

A Doctor of Sciences (Note: Russian: доктор наук, IPA: [ˈdoktər nɐˈuk], abbreviated д-р наук or д. н.; Ukrainian: доктор наук; Kazakh: ғылым докторы; Bulgarian: доктор на науките; Belarusian: доктар навук) is a higher doctoral degree that was awarded in the Russian Empire, the Soviet Union and many Commonwealth of Independent States countries. It is currently awarded in some post-soviet nations, particularly Russia and Belarus. One of the prerequisites for receiving a Doctor of Sciences degree is obtaining a PhD-equivalent Candidate of Sciences degree. In addition, the Doctor of Sciences conferral also requires applicants to demonstrate significant and outstanding contributions to their research field. This degree is generally regarded as recognition for a lifetime of academic achievements rather than an ordinary academic degree achieved through courses and theses.

== History ==
The Doctor of Sciences degree was introduced in the Russian Empire in 1819 and abolished in 1917. Later it was revived in the USSR on January 13, 1934, by the Council of People's Commissars of the USSR. In the same decision, a lower degree, "Candidate of Sciences" (kandidat nauk), roughly the Russian equivalent to the research doctorate in other countries, was first introduced. This system was generally adopted by the USSR/Russia and many post-Soviet/Eastern bloc states, including Bulgaria, Belarus, former Czechoslovakia, Kazakhstan, Poland and Ukraine. Since the 1990s, however, many post-soviet nations no longer award a Doctor of Sciences degree.

Nations that do still award the Doctor of Sciences degree, Bosnia Herzegovina, Croatia, Montenegro, North Macedonia, Serbia, and Slovenia, follow the Bologna Process, and therefore the Doctor of Sciences degree is equivalent to either a PhD or a higher doctorate, depending on the institution awarding the degree.

== Admission ==
Doctor of Sciences degrees are conferred by a national government agency called the Vysshaya attestatsionnaya komissiya (VAK), or Higher Attestation Commission, on the recommendation of a specialized dissertation committee before which the candidate has defended her or his dissertation. Such committees are created in academic institutions with a solid research record and the committees must be accredited by VAK. The total number of committee members is typically about 20, all holding the Doctor of Sciences degree. The area of research specialization of at least five committee members must match the profile of the materials submitted by the doctoral candidate for consideration. The candidate must conduct independent research with no academic supervisor required. Typically the candidate is an established scholar and supervises Ph.D. students while working towards their dissertation. However, it is normal practice for an experienced consultant to be appointed to help the scholar with identifying the research problem and finding the approach to solving it, though this is not technically regarded as supervision.

The procedures of conferring of both Kandidat and Doktor academic degrees are more formal and different from conferring a Ph.D. degree in Western universities. In particular, for the Doktor, the academic institution where the scholar is affiliated as a doctoral candidate must conduct a preliminary review of the research results and personal contribution made by the candidate and, depending on the findings, elect whether to render formal support or not. By definition, this highly prestigious degree can be conferred only for a significant contribution to science and/or technology based on a public defense of a thesis, monograph, or (in rare cases) of a set of outstanding publications in peer-reviewed journals. The defense must be held at the session of a Specialized Dissertation Committee accredited by VAK. Prior to the defense, three referees holding Doctor of Sciences degrees themselves (the so-called "official opponents") must submit their written motivated assessments of the thesis. One additional similar assessment is to be provided by a university or academic institution working in the same field of science or technology, and several other reviewers must mail a record of their conclusions based on the thesis summary (usually a 32-page brochure in natural sciences and 48 pages in social sciences).

In the former USSR, this degree was considered a sufficient credential for tenured full professorship at any institution of higher education. Unless an academic holds a Doctor of Sciences, she or he can make it to a full professor only if they author at least one published and widely accepted textbook, hold the degree of Kandidat Nauk, and have 15 years or more of outstanding teaching service at the university level. In contrast, a Doctor of Sciences degree holder can become a tenured full professor after just one year of teaching experience in a non-tenured faculty position. A degree of Doctor of Sciences also enables its holders to claim an academic rank of a professor awarded by VAK or the rank of Professor of the Russian Academy of Sciences, a rank established in 2015.

The Doctor of Sciences thus has no academic equivalent in North America, as it is a post-doctoral degree.

The German Habilitation and, to some extent, the French habilitation à diriger des recherches (HDR) are comparable to it, as are the British higher doctorates (e.g. Doctor of Science), although the last-mentioned are not required for career advancement. On average, only 10 percent of Kandidats eventually earn a Doktor degree. Although some exceptionally talented researchers in mathematics do earn Doctor of Sciences in their late 20s, the average age of the scholars reaching Doktor in most disciplines is about 50, which indicates the significant contribution required to achieve the degree.

According to the Ministry of Education and Science of the Russian Federation, "In countries with a two-tier system of doctoral degrees, the degree of Doctor Nauk should be considered for recognition at the level of the second doctoral degree. In countries with only one doctoral degree, the degree of Doctor Nauk should be considered for recognition as equivalent to this degree."

According to guidelines published by the Russian Academy of Sciences:

1. д. арх. (Russian: доктор архитектуры) – Doctor of Sciences in Architecture
2. д. б. н. (Russian: доктор биологических наук) – Doctor of Sciences in Biological Sciences
3. д. вет. н. (Russian: доктор ветеринарных наук) – Doctor of Sciences in Veterinary Sciences
4. д. воен. н. (Russian: доктор военных наук) – Doctor of Sciences in Military Sciences
5. д. г. н. (Russian: доктор географических наук) – Doctor of Sciences in Geographical Sciences
6. д. г.-м. н. (Russian: доктор геолого-минералогических наук) – Doctor of Sciences in Geological and Mineralogical Sciences
7. д. и. н. (Russian: доктор исторических наук) – Doctor of Sciences in Historical Sciences
8. д. иск. (Russian: доктор искусствоведения) – Doctor of Sciences in Study of Art
9. д. м. н. (Russian: доктор медицинских наук) – Doctor of Sciences in Medical Sciences
10. д. п. н. (Russian: доктор психологических наук) – Doctor of Sciences in Psychological Sciences
11. д. пед. н. (Russian: доктор педагогических наук) – Doctor of Sciences in Pedagogical Sciences
12. д. полит. н. (Russian: доктор политических наук) – Doctor of Sciences in Political Sciences
13. д. с.-х. н. (Russian: доктор сельскохозяйственных наук) – Doctor of Sciences in Agricultural Sciences
14. д. социол. н. (Russian: доктор социологических наук) – Doctor of Sciences in Sociological Sciences
15. д. т. н. (Russian: доктор технических наук) – Doctor of Sciences in Technical Sciences
16. д. теол. н. (Russian: доктор теологических наук) – Doctor of Sciences in Religious Sciences
17. д. ф. н. (Russian: доктор филологических наук) – Doctor of Sciences in Philological Sciences
18. д. фарм. н. (Russian: доктор фармацевтических наук) – Doctor of Sciences in Pharmaceutics
19. д. ф.-м. н. (Russian: доктор физико-математических наук) – Doctor of Sciences in Physical and Mathematical Sciences
20. д. филос. н. (Russian: доктор философских наук) – Doctor of Sciences in Philosophical Sciences
21. д. х. н. (Russian: доктор химических наук) – Doctor of Sciences in Chemical Sciences
22. д. э. н. (Russian: доктор экономических наук) – Doctor of Sciences in Economics
23. д. ю. н. (Russian: доктор юридических наук) – Doctor of Sciences in Jurisprudence

According to the International Standard Classification of Education, for purposes of international educational statistics:

1. D.Sc.; D.Phil. to Doctor of Sciences in Philosophy,
2. D.Lit.; Dr.Litt. to Doctor of Sciences in Literature,
3. D.Sc.; Dr.Nat.Sci. to Doctor of Sciences of Natural Science,
4. LL.D.; D.Sci.Jus. to Doctor of Sciences of Legal Science.

== See also ==
- Academic degree
- Candidate of Sciences
- Doctor of Medicine
- Education in Russia
- Habilitation
