= Professor of the Russian Academy of Sciences =

Academic rank of the Russian Academy of Sciences

Professor of the Russian Academy of Sciences (Professor of the RAS, or RAS Professor; Russian: Профе́ссор Росси́йской акаде́мии нау́к – Proféssor Rossíiskoj akadémii naúk) is an academic rank introduced in 2015 by the RAS to be conferred to distinguished Russian scientists from all fields, who are not yet members of the Academy. Research achievements of RAS Professors are supposed to be higher than those of an ordinary university professor but their teaching experience may be relatively modest. Along with its role as an academic rank, “RAS Professor” is an honorary title emphasizing merits of an individual.

As a concept, the RAS Professorship was originally proposed by the Presidium of RAS and its President (in 2013—2017) Vladimir Fortov, the motivation being to boost an involvement of top researches from the younger generation of Russian scientists in the functioning of the Russian Academy of Sciences.

== Requirements and criteria ==
The formal prerequisites for the rank of a RAS Professor are Russian citizenship, affiliation with some RAS institution or accredited university, the academic degree of Doctor of Sciences ("Doktor nauk", a Russian equivalent to the second degree in countries with a two-tier system of doctoral degrees), and the candidate's being under 50 years of age at the time the award is to be granted.

The key factors taken into account when RAS Professors are elected include recognized scientific results and records of publications in peer-reviewed journals, along with the candidate's authoring books and patents, advising PhD works etc. A candidacy is to be suggested by a RAS member or by the scientific council of his/her respective institution. Apart from the recommendation and the age constraint, the requirements are similar, though not identical, to those imposed by the Higher Attestation Commission in Russia for the traditional (i.e. not RAS) professor rank. The election is a two-stage process comprising the primary round in the pertinent RAS Department and a confirmation through the vote in the RAS Presidium.

== Status within and outside of RAS ==
The RAS Professors are de facto associate Academy members with a status below that of full members (academicians) and the corresponding members. RAS Professors are eligible to take part in meetings of the RAS field-specific and territorial divisions, to submit proposals on organizational and other issues relevant to RAS, and to serve as professional experts. At the same time, research remains the priority mission of a RAS Professor.

Outside of RAS (e.g. at the universities or in industry) the RAS Professorship is expected to have significant weight among a scholar's credentials when employment terms, contracts etc. are formulated, but its importance will only be assessed on a case-by-case basis.

Like many other components of the Russian system of academic degrees and ranks, the RAS Professorship evokes no immediate analogy with established titles or degrees in other countries. The “professional portrait” of a RAS Professor coincides on the whole with the one of a top-league US Professor aged around 45.

== Elected RAS Professors ==
The elections of RAS Professors should be called in every 2–3 years.

Up to now, such elections were organized four times. The first event took place in the Academy in the winter of 2015-2016, the second in March-April 2018, the third in April-May 2022 and the last in December 2025. Totally, 801 scientists hold the honorary RAS Professor rank.

Roughly 53% of the RAS Professors reside and work in Moscow, e.g., but researchers from across Russia, including its Far East, Siberia (over 100 RAS Professors), the Urals (more than 35 RAS Professors, e.g.), and St.-Petersburg (more than 65 RAS Professors) are represented in the overall number. Some of the RAS Professors are affiliates of Russia's most acclaimed research institutes such as the Lebedev Institute, the Steklov Institute, and the Ioffe Institute, and of the top universities, among them – Moscow State University, Novosibirsk State University etc. Two Russian citizens working outside of the country on a permanent basis were also elected as an exception, though normally a candidate is expected to do research in and for Russia. The age limit was a critical filter considering that the generation currently approaching the 50-years age mark is underrepresented in Russian academia after the economic and political crisis in Russia in the 1990s forced many to emigrate or to drop out of science.

External image
- RAS Professor Certificate

Each holder of the title of RAS Professor receives a certificate (s. photo).

In October 2016, November 2019, May-June 2022 and May 2025, totally 188 professors were upgraded to the corresponding membership in the Academy and 31 professors to full membership. Until 2025, after election to the Academy, the scientist was double-titled as “RAS professor, corresponding (or full) member of the RAS”. However according to the last edition of the RAS professorship regulation the professor rank is hence to be omitted in such cases, i.e. the title would contain only the Academy status part. From this bureaucratic point the number of RAS professors is now not 801 but 801 – 188 – 31 = 582 although both interpretations may be encountered.

The last election of RAS Professors proceeded in December 2025; 89 scientists got the title.

== RAS Professors’ activity ==
The community of RAS Professors works under the auspices of the Presidium of the Russian Academy of Science and under the administrative guidance of its Center for Strategic Planning. A Coordination Council was formed bringing together renown Professors; in 2016-2018 Prof. Alexey A. Gromyko, Director of the Institute of Europe and the grandson of the outstanding Soviet diplomat Andrei Gromyko, served as the Council Chairman, succeeded, since April 2018, by Prof. Alexander A. Lutovinov, Vice-director of the Russian Space Research Institute.

Several virtual working groups responsible for the advancement of activities such as strategic forecasting, the integration of research and education in Russia, the formulation of national research priorities, the research community's public relations etc. have been set up within the community.

Unlike full or corresponding Academy members, RAS Professors receive no pay for the rank. It remains to be seen how helpful the rank will be to its holders in obtaining promotions in and outside of their institutions, while the work in the community of RAS Professors is performed on a voluntary basis. RAS Professors make no formal commitment to perform any duties unrelated to their original employment, but the new rank is widely seen as an opportunity to get involved in debates on key problems of national science, to participate in shaping the future of the Academy, to contribute to the federal level decision-making, and to engage with mass media covering research, technology, and global development.

== See also ==
- Russian Academy of Sciences
- Academic ranks in Russia
- Academy professor
