= Severini =

Severini is an Italian surname. Notable people with the surname include:

- Aaron Severini, New York City Ballet dancer
- Amerigo Severini (1931–2020), Italian cyclist
- Carlo Severini (1872–1951), Italian mathematician
- Gilberto Severini (1941–2025), Italian author
- Gino Severini (1883–1966), Italian painter
