= August Davidov =

Russian mathematician (1823–1886)

August Yulevich Davidov
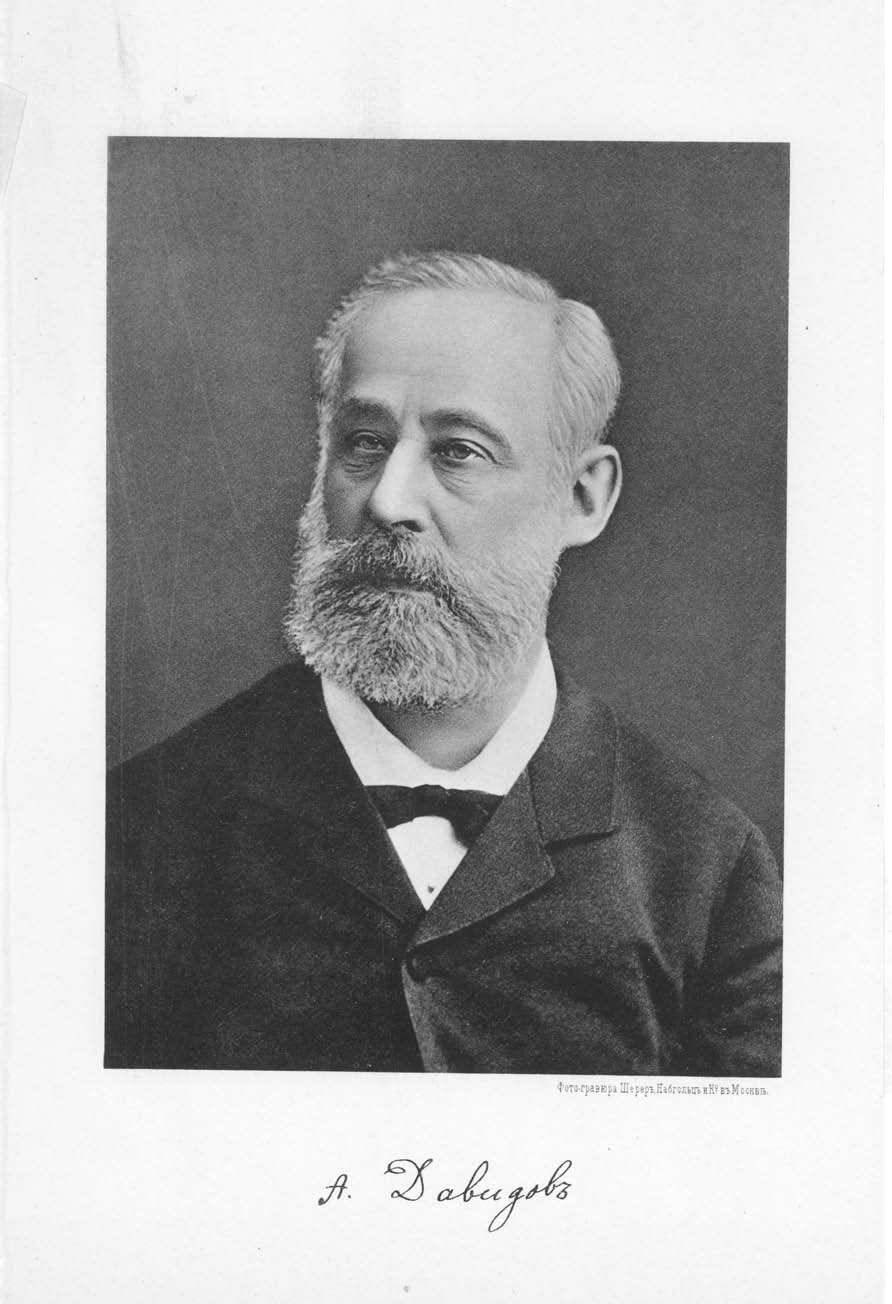
- Born: December 15, 1823; Liepāja, Courland Governorate, Russian Empire
- Died: December 22, 1885 (aged 62); Moscow, Russian Empire
- Resting place: Vvedenskoye Cemetery
- Education: Imperial Moscow University (1845)
- Known for: President of the IMO and textbook author
- Awards: Demidov Prize
- Scientific career
- Fields: Mathematics
- Workplaces: Imperial Moscow University
- Academic advisors: Nikolai Brashman
- Notable students: Nikolai Zhukovsky; Nikolai Bugaev

August Yulevich Davidov (Russian: А́вгуст Ю́льевич Дави́дов; December 27 [O.S. December 15] 1823 – January 3, 1886 [O.S. December 22, 1885]) was a Russian mathematician and engineer, professor at Moscow University, and author of works on differential equations with partial derivatives, definite integrals, and the application of probability theory to statistics, and textbooks on elementary mathematics which were repeatedly reprinted from the 1860s to the 1920s. He was president of the Moscow Mathematical Society from 1866 to 1885.

== Early life and education ==
Davidov was born in Courland where his father was a physician, and his younger brother Karl Davidov (1838–1889) became a noted cellist and composer and director of the St. Petersburg Conservatory.

In 1839, Davidov was sent to Moscow to attend the school that is now Bauman Moscow State Technical University. In 1841, Davidov enrolled in the Department of Physics and Mathematics at Moscow University, where he studied under Nikolai Brashman (1796–1866). In 1845 he won a gold medal from the university for his paper "On Infinitesimal Displacements". He was graduated that same year but continued his studies under Brashman. In 1848 he received the title of Master of Mathematics (and later the Demidov Prize from the St. Petersburg Academy of Sciences) for his paper "The Theory of Equilibrium of Bodies Immersed in a Liquid".

== Teaching career ==
Davidov worked briefly as a mathematics teacher in the Cadet Corps, then in 1850, he started as an Associate Lecturer on the theory of probability in the Physics and Mathematics Department of Moscow University. In 1851, he defended his doctoral dissertation "Determination of the Surface of the Fluid Contained in a Vessel" and in the same year published his paper "Theory of Capillary Phenomena". (Note: According to some sources, "Theory of Capillary Phenomena" was Davidov's doctoral thesis.)

In 1853, Davidov was appointed Extraordinary Professor in the Department of Applied Mathematics, a position he retained until 1859, when he was appointed Full Professor in the same department. In 1862, Davidov moved to the chair of pure mathematics and remained in that post until the end of his tenure at the university. In 1864, he created a new course on the theory of functions, which he taught until 1869 (after which it was taught by his student Nikolai Bugaev).

Davidov had a great influence on Nikolai Zhukovsky, the "Father of Russian Aviation", who studied at Moscow University (1864–1868) and devoted two essays to analysis of Davidov's work.

== Leadership and organizational roles ==
In 1863 Davidov was elected Dean of the Department of Physics and Mathematics at Moscow University, a post he held until 1873. He was again elected to the position in 1878 and held it until 1880. He served as Vice–President and then President of the Society of Devotees of Natural Science, Anthropology, and Ethnography, was President of the Imperial Russian Society of Acclimatization of Plants and Animals, and was a member of the Natural History Society.

The Moscow Mathematical Society emerged as a scientific circle of mathematics teachers (mostly from the Moscow University), united around a professor of the physics and mathematics faculty of Moscow State University, Nikolai Brashman. The first meeting of the Society was held on September 27, 1864. Brashman was elected first President of the Society and Davidov Vice–President. In 1866, after the death of Brashman, Davidov was elected the second President and remained in the post until his death almost twenty years later. (Note: Since the Society's charter was only approved in 1867, some sources list Davidov as the first President of the Moscow Mathematical Society.)

== Pedagogical work ==
Title page of Davidov's textbook Geometry

In 1860, Davidov was appointed Inspector of private educational institutions and community activities and became actively engaged in improving the teaching of mathematics at secondary schools. In 1862, he became a member of the Board of Trustees of the Moscow School District, a post he held for the rest of his life. He participated in the design of mathematics curricula under the aegis of the Pedagogical Department of Primary Education of the Polytechnical Museum, and on his initiative the journal Mathematics Anthology added a section for teachers.

Davidov's most lasting contribution to primary and secondary education was his textbooks on mathematics subjects in which he expounded on the mathematical theory in close connection with practical examples, using historical data in examples and incorporating visual aids. These textbooks were well received and went through dozens of reprintings over many decades with little alteration. For instance Upper Secondary School Course on Elementary Geometry went through 39 editions over sixty years and Elementary Algebra 24 editions, the last two under Soviet auspices in 1918 and 1922.

== Death ==
Davidov retired from Moscow University in June 1885 after thirty years of service. That same year, on December 22, he died and was buried in Vvedenskoye Cemetery.

After his death, his widow established a prize in his name, awarded for outstanding work in mathematics. Among the winners of this award were the future academician Nikolai Luzin.

Davidov's son Alexei Davidov (1867–1940) became a cellist and composer, then a successful businessman and industrialist and (after the Russian Revolution) an exile in Germany.

== Works ==
Davidov authored works in mathematics (theory of partial differential equations, theory of definite integrals, application of probability theory to problems of statistics) and mechanics (hydrodynamics, theory of equilibrium of floating bodies, research on links between the theory of capillary phenomena and general equilibrium theory).

Works on mathematics includes:

- The application of probability theory to statistics.
- The application of probability theory to medicine.
- Davidov, August (1866). Уравнения с частными дифференциалами какого-нибудь порядка [Equations with partial differentials of any order]. Mathematics Anthology (Математический сборник) (in Russian). 1 (1). Moscow: Moscow Mathematical Society: 351–390.
- Davidov, August (1867). "Элементарный вывод формулы $e^{m\sqrt{-1}}=\cos m+\sin m\sqrt{-1}$" [An elementary derivation of the formula $e^{m\sqrt{-1}}=\cos m+\sin m\sqrt{-1}$]. Mathematics Anthology (Математический сборник) (in Russian). 2 (1). Moscow: Moscow Mathematical Society: 20–25.
- Davidov, August (1867). О геометрическом представлении эллиптических функций первого вида [On a geometric representation of elliptic functions of the first kind]. Mathematics Anthology (Математический сборник) (in Russian). 2 (2). Moscow: Moscow Mathematical Society: 129–142.
- Davidov, August (1870). Замечание об Абелевых функциях [A note on Abelian functions]. Mathematics Anthology (Математический сборник) (in Russian). 4 (4). Moscow: Moscow Mathematical Society: 287–296.
- Davidov, August (1882). Об одной общей формуле в теории определённых интегралов [A general formula in the theory of definite integrals]. Mathematics Anthology (Математический сборник) (in Russian). 10 (1). Moscow: Moscow Mathematical Society: 3–29.

Works on mechanics include:

- Design and operation of steam engines.
- The greatest number of equilibria of a floating triangular prism.
- The theory of equilibrium of bodies immersed in a liquid.
- Davidov, August (1870). Единство мер и весов [The unity of weights and measures]. Mathematics Anthology (Математический сборник) (in Russian). 4 (3). Moscow: Moscow Mathematical Society: 97–110.

School textbooks include:

- Upper Secondary School Course on Elementary Geometry (1863)
- Elementary Algebra (1866)
- Guide to Arithmetic (1870)
- Geometry for the County Schools (1873)
- Elementary Trigonometry (1877)
- Anthology of Geometric Problems (1888) (Davidov worked on this book at the very end of his life, and it was published after his death.)
