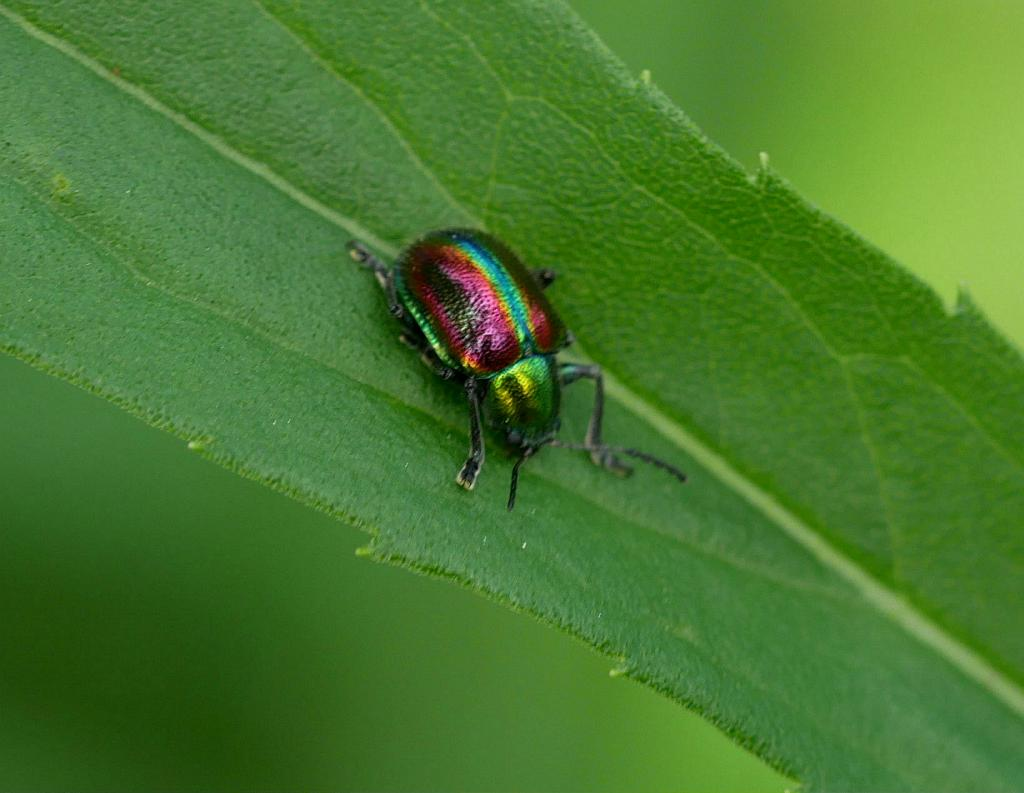
- Acrothinium gaschkevitchii, Tanabe City, Wakayama Pref., Japan

Scientific classification
- Kingdom: Animalia
- Phylum: Arthropoda
- Class: Insecta
- Order: Coleoptera
- Suborder: Polyphaga
- Infraorder: Cucujiformia
- Family: Chrysomelidae
- Subfamily: Eumolpinae
- Tribe: Bromiini
- Genus: Acrothinium
- Species: A. gaschkevitchii

Binomial name
- Acrothinium gaschkevitchii (Motschulsky, 1861)

Synonyms
- Chrysochus gaschkevitchii Motschulsky, 1861

= Acrothinium gaschkevitchii =

Species of leaf beetle

Acrothinium gaschkevitchii in Japan

Acrothinium gaschkevitchii is a species of leaf beetle in the family Chrysomelidae. It is distributed in East Asia.

== Etymology ==
The species is named after the wife of Russian diplomat Iosif Goshkevich. She had sent Motschulsky a collection of insects from Japan, including specimens of Acrothinium gaschkevitchii, that she had collected in the vicinity of her residence at Hakodate and during her trips between Honshu and Hokkaido.

== Description ==
A. gaschkevitchii has a shiny metallic appearance, and its back is sparsely covered with setae. In the nominate subspecies, A. g. gaschkevitchii, the pronotum is green in color, and the elytra are golden red to copper-color with green at their margins. The other subspecies have different coloration: A. g. tokaraense is generally golden green in color, rarely bright coppery; in A. g. matsuii, the head is green with bluish tinges, the pronotum is greenish violet-blue, with the front edge greenish blue, the elytra are greenish violet with their base and side margins violet; in A. g. shirakii, the head and pronotum are metallic green, with the space between eyes and side of pronotum being bluish or violet-colored, and the elytra are golden or coppery green with a violet color at their margins.

== Subspecies ==
There are five subspecies of A. gaschkevitchii:

- Acrothinium gaschkevitchii gaschkevitchii (Motschulsky, 1861) – East China (Fujian, Jiangxi, Zhejiang), Taiwan, Japan, South Korea
- Acrothinium gaschkevitchii matsuii Nakane, 1956 – Japan (Okinoerabu)
- Acrothinium gaschkevitchii okinawense Nakane, 1985 – Japan (Okinawa)
- Acrothinium gaschkevitchii shirakii Nakane, 1956 – Japan (Amami Ōshima, Okinawa)
- Acrothinium gaschkevitchii tokaraense Nakane, 1956 – Japan (Tokara Islands)
