= Andrey Gonchar =

Soviet and Russian mathematician

Andrey Aleksandrovich Gonchar (Андрей Александрович Гончар, 21 November 1931, Leningrad – 10 October 2012, Moscow) was a Soviet and Russian mathematician, specializing in analysis.

At the Moscow State University Gonchar graduated in 1954 and received in 1967 his Russian candidate degree (Ph.D.) under Sergey Mergelyan, He received his Russian doctorate (higher doctoral degree) in 1964 from the Steklov Institute. Gonchar was a professor at the Steklov Institute and the Moscow State University. From 1972 to 2002 he was a member of the complex analysis department of the Steklov Institute.

Gonchar's research focused on Padé approximants (specifically the relation between the convergence of the Padé approximants and the analytic properties of the function to be approximated) and asymptotic properties of orthogonal polynomials (investigated by means of potential theory).

He was an Invited Speaker of the ICM in Moscow in 1966 (Properties of functions related to the rapidity with which they can be approximated by rational functions) and in Berkeley 1986 (Rational approximations of analytic functions). He was elected in 1974 a corresponding member and in 1987 a full member of the Russian Academy of Sciences, of which he was a vice president from 1991 to 1998. In 1998 he received the Demidov Prize.

From 1988 until his death he was an editor for the Matematicheskii Sbornik.
