= Zhuravsky =

The surname Zhuravsky may refer to:

- Vitaly Zhuravsky (born 1955) is a Ukrainian MP elected to the Verkhovna Rada in the 2012 Ukrainian parliamentary election for Party of Regions from the Zhytomyr region.
- Dmitry Zhuravsky (1821–1891) was a Russian engineer who was one of the pioneers of bridge construction and structural mechanics in Russia.
- Nikolay Zhuravsky (born 1964) is a Moldovan politician and former canoe sprinter
