= Relationship between telomeres and longevity =

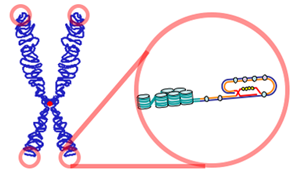
Telomeres at the ends of a chromosome

The relationship between telomeres and longevity and changing the length of telomeres is one of the new fields of research on increasing human lifespan and even human immortality. Telomeres are sequences at the ends of chromosomes that shorten with each cell division and determine the lifespan of cells. The telomere was first discovered by biologist Hermann Joseph Muller in the early 20th century. However, experiments by Elizabeth Blackburn, Carol Greider, and Jack Szostak in the 1980s led to the successful discovery of telomerase (the enzyme responsible for maintaining telomere length) and a better understanding of telomeres.

Telomeres play essential roles in the stability and control of cell division. Telomeres protect chromosomes from deterioration and fusion with neighboring chromosomes and act as a buffer zone, preventing the loss of essential genetic information during cell division.

It is predicted that the knowledge of methods to increase the length of cell telomeres (stem cell and quasi-stem cells, control the regeneration and rebuilding of different tissues of the body) will pave the way for increasing human lifespan. Examining telomeres is one of the most important fields of research related to aging. It is also very important to investigate the mechanisms of maintaining telomerase, cell cleansing (old cells that accumulate in tissues and sometimes cause cancer and inflammation) and the production of new cells in long-lived organisms. However, this idea faces major challenges such as increased cancer incidence, immune system problems, and unwanted long-term consequences.

== Telomere and telomerase ==
In the early 1970s, Alexey Olovnikov first recognized that chromosomes cannot completely duplicate their ends during cell division. This is known as the "end replication problem". Olovnikov proposed that every time a cell divides, a part of the DNA sequence is lost, and if this loss reaches a certain level, cell division will stop at the end. According to his "marginotomy" theory, there are sequences at the end of the DNA (telomeres) that are placed in tandem repeats and create a buffer zone that determines the number of divisions a particular cell can undergo.

Many organisms have a ribonucleoprotein enzyme called telomerase, which is responsible for adding repetitive nucleotide sequences to the ends of DNA. Telomerase replicates the telomere head and does not require ATP. In most multicellular eukaryotic organisms, telomerase is active only in germ cells, some types of stem cells such as embryonic stem cells, and certain white blood cells. Telomerase can be reactivated and telomeres restored to the embryonic state by somatic cell nuclear transfer. The continuous shortening of telomeres with each replication in somatic (body) cells may play a role in aging and in cancer prevention. This is because telomeres act as a kind of "delayed fuse" and eventually run out after a certain number of cell divisions. This action results in the loss of vital genetic information from the cell's chromosome after multiple divisions. Research on telomerase is extremely important in understanding its role in maintaining telomere length and its potential implications for aging and cancer.

== Challenges ==
While telomeres play an important role in cellular senescence, the intricate biological details of telomeres still require further investigation. The complex interactions between telomeres, different proteins and the cellular environment must be fully understood in order to develop precise and safe interventions to change it. Understanding the long-term effects of telomere extension on the body is complex and risky. Prediction of long-term consequences, including potential unanticipated side effects or interactions with other cellular processes, requires thorough and long-term investigation.

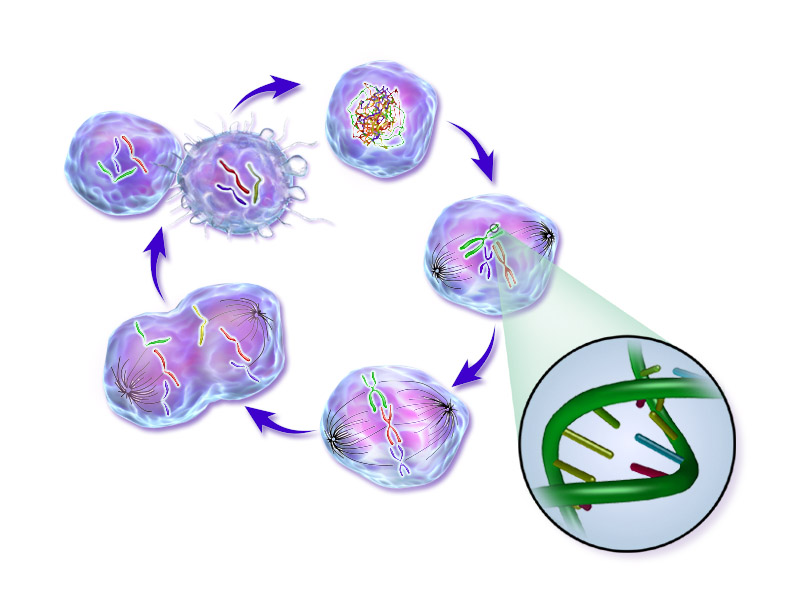
Disturbances in cell division processes and mutations in DNA are among the most important causes of cancer. Cancer cells develop mechanisms to increase their lifespan.

=== Increased risk of cancer ===
Extending telomeres can allow cells to divide more and increase the risk of uncontrolled cell growth and cancer development. A study conducted by Johns Hopkins University challenged the idea that long telomeres prevent aging. Rather than protecting cells from aging, long telomeres help cells with age-related mutations last longer. This problem prepares the conditions for the occurrence of various types of cancer, and people with longer cell telomeres showed more signs of suffering from types of cancer such as Melanoma and Lymphoma.

=== Telomere length balance ===
It is important to strike the right balance to avoid unintended consequences.

=== Old cells and telomere dysfunction ===
Telomere dysfunction during cellular aging (a state in which cells do not divide but are metabolically active) affects the health of the body. Preventing telomere shortening without clearing old cells may lead to the accumulation of these cells in the body and contribute to age-related diseases and tissue dysfunction.

=== Intertissue differences ===
Different tissues of the human body may react differently to changes in telomeres. Telomere length is different in different tissues and cell types of the body. Developing a general telomere lengthening strategy that is effective in all tissues is a complex task. Additionally understanding how different types of cells, organs and systems react to telomere manipulation is important for developing safe and effective interventions.

=== Effects on the immune system ===
The immune system plays an important role in monitoring and destroying abnormal or cancerous cells. Telomere extension may affect the immune system's ability to recognize and eliminate cells with long telomeres, potentially compromising immune surveillance. It is very important to ensure the ability of the immune system to effectively identify and fight against pathogens and abnormal cells.

== See also ==
- Apoptosis
- Neurodegenerative disease
- Programmed cell death
- HeLa
