= Nevolin =

Nevolin (Russian: Неволин) is a Russian masculine surname; its feminine counterpart is Nevolina. It may refer to

- Alexander Nevolin-Svetov (born 1988), Russian Paralympic swimmer
- Konstantin Nevolin (1806–1855), Russian legal historian
