= Privalov =

Privalov (Russian: Привалов, from привал meaning halt) is a Russian masculine surname, its feminine counterpart is Privalova. Notable people with the surname include:

- Aleksandr Privalov (1933–2021), Soviet biathlete
- Aleksandra Privalova (born 1987), Belarusian table tennis player
- Irina Privalova (born 1968), Russian sprinter
- Ivan Privalov (1891–1941), Russian mathematician
- Ivan Privalov (footballer) (1902–1974), Ukrainian football player

== In fiction ==
- Sergey Privalov, character in the two-part feature film Privalov's Millions
- Aleksandr Ivanovich Privalov, character in the science fiction novel Monday Begins on Saturday
