= Moscow Mathematical Society =

Mathematical society in Moscow

- Formation: 1864 (162 years ago)
- Headquarters: Moscow, Russia
- President: Victor Vassiliev
- Website: mms.mathnet.ru

The Moscow Mathematical Society (MMS) is a society of Moscow mathematicians aimed at the development of mathematics in Russia. It was created in 1864, and Victor Vassiliev is the president.

== History ==
The first meeting of the society was 27 September [O.S. 15 September] 1864. Nikolai Brashman was the society's first president.

The Moscow Mathematical Society was first created in 1810 by extended members of the Muraviev family, but it closed down the year after. In the early 1860s, Nikolai Brashman and August Davidov relaunched the Moscow Mathematical Society at Moscow University and organized its first meeting on 15 September 1864. The stated goal was "mutual cooperation in the study of the mathematical sciences".

Brashman was president, and Davidov vice-president. Fourteen members joined the society, with Pafnuty Chebyshev among them. Each member was in charge of a research project, and the group met monthly to share progress on their projects.

The outcome was so valuable that the society decided in April 1865 to publish its works. The first edition of the journal Matematicheskii Sbornik, edited by the society, was released in October 1866.

By 1913, the society had 112 members. The publication of the Matematicheskii Sbornik ceased from 1919 to 1924.

== Former presidents ==
- Nikolai Brashman (1864–1866)
- August Davidov (1866–1886)
- Vasily Jakovlevich Zinger (1886–1891)
- Nikolai Bugaev (1891–1903)
- Pavel Alekseevich Nekrasov (1903–1905)
- Nikolai Zhukovsky (1905–1921)
- Boleslav Mlodzeevskii (1921–1923)
- Dmitri Egorov (1923–1930)
- Ernst Kolman (1930–1932)
- Pavel Alexandrov (1932–1964)
- Andrey Kolmogorov (1964–1966, 1973–1985)
- Israel Gelfand (1966–1970)
- Igor Shafarevich (1970–1973)
- Sergei Novikov (1985–1996)
- Vladimir Arnold (1996–2010)

== Annual prize ==
Every year, the society awards a young mathematician for his or her outstanding work in the field. Recipients include:

- 1951 : Evgenii Landis
- 1956 : Friedrich Karpelevich
- 1958 : Vladimir Arnold
- 1967 : Anatoly Stepin
- 1986 : Victor Vassiliev
- 2013 : Eugene Gorsky
- 2015 : Leonid Petrov

== See also ==
- Education in Russia
- List of mathematical societies
