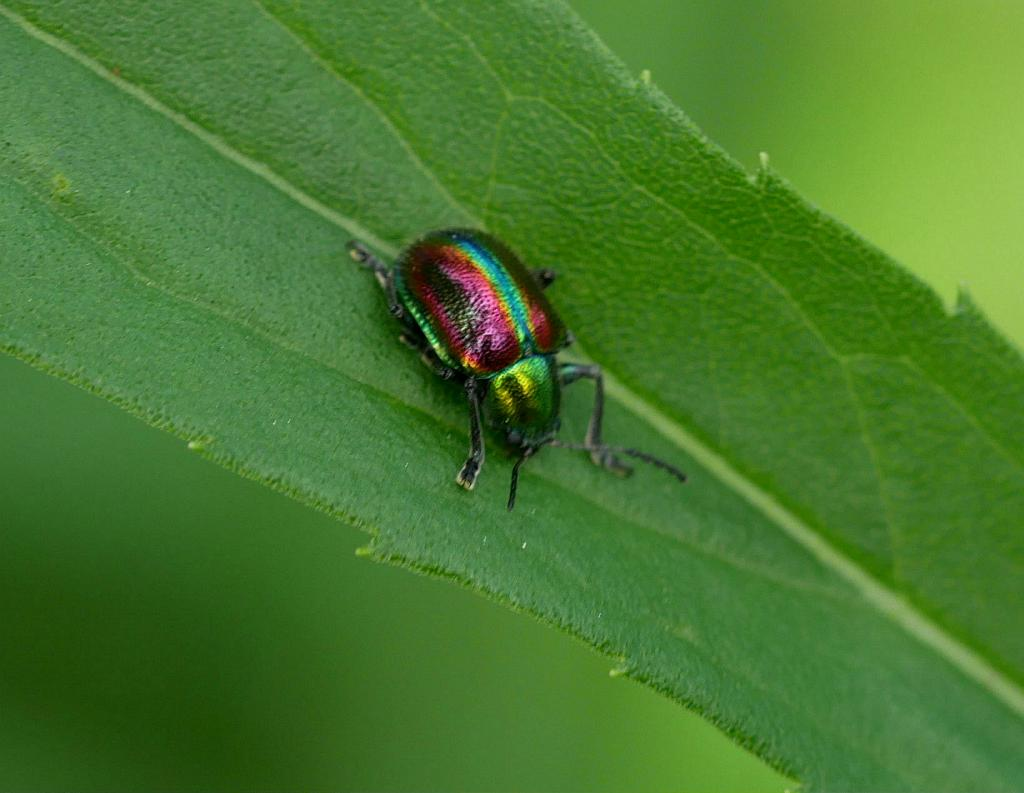
- Acrothinium gaschkevitchii

Scientific classification
- Kingdom: Animalia
- Phylum: Arthropoda
- Clade: Pancrustacea
- Class: Insecta
- Order: Coleoptera
- Suborder: Polyphaga
- Infraorder: Cucujiformia
- Family: Chrysomelidae
- Subfamily: Eumolpinae
- Tribe: Bromiini
- Genus: Acrothinium; Marshall, 1865

Type species
- Chrysochus gaschkevitchii Motschulsky, 1861

= Acrothinium =

Genus of beetles from Asia

Acrothinium is a genus of leaf beetles in the subfamily Eumolpinae. It contains three species, which are distributed in East Asia.

== Species ==
- Acrothinium cupricolle Jacoby, 1888 – East China (Fujian, Jiangxi, Zhejiang)
- Acrothinium cyaneum Chen, 1940 – South China (Hainan)
- Acrothinium gaschkevitchii (Motschulsky, 1861)
  - Acrothinium gaschkevitchii gaschkevitchii (Motschulsky, 1861) – East China (Fujian, Jiangxi, Zhejiang), Taiwan, Japan, South Korea
  - Acrothinium gaschkevitchii matsuii Nakane, 1956 – Japan (Okinoerabu)
  - Acrothinium gaschkevitchii okinawense Nakane, 1985 – Japan (Okinawa)
  - Acrothinium gaschkevitchii shirakii Nakane, 1956 – Japan (Amami Ōshima, Okinawa)
  - Acrothinium gaschkevitchii tokaraense Nakane, 1956 – Japan (Tokara Islands)

Synonyms:

- Acrothinium hirsutum Tan & Wang, 2005: moved to Heterotrichus
- Acrothinium piffli Mandl, 1965: synonym of Colasposoma ornatum Jacoby, 1881
- Acrothinium violaceum Jacoby, 1889: synonym of Heterotrichus balyi Chapuis, 1874
