= Boris Kashin =

Russian mathematician (born 1951)

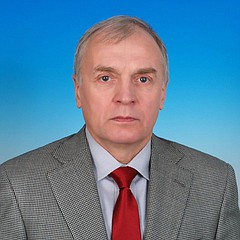
- Born: July 3, 1951; Moscow, RSFSR
- Education: MSU Faculty of Mechanics and Mathematics
- Awards: Kolmogorov Prize (2012)
- Scientific career
- Workplaces: Steklov Mathematical Institute, MSU Faculty of Mechanics and Mathematics

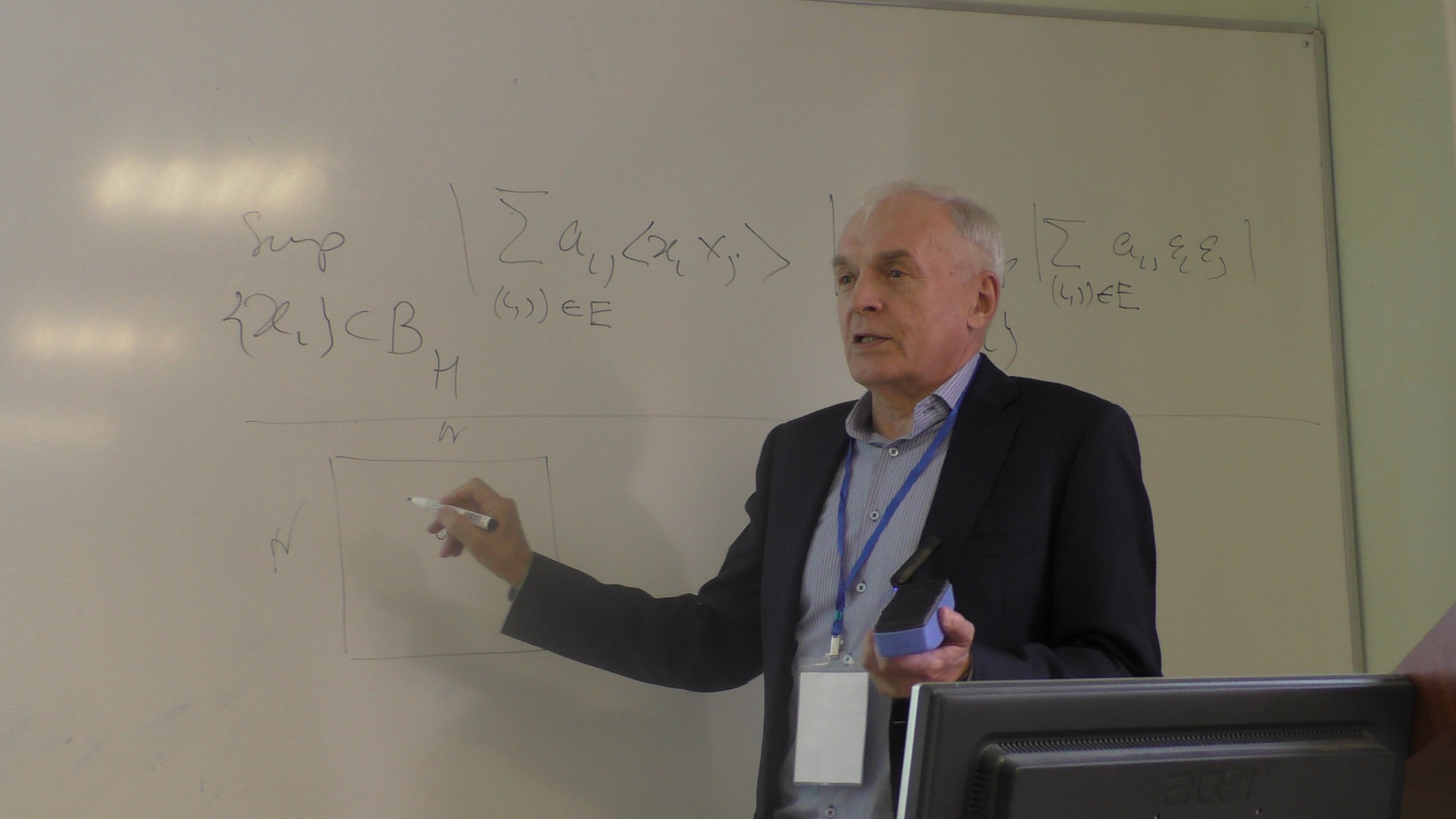
Lecture by Boris Kashin at the Karelian Scientific Center of the Russian Academy of Sciences, 2021

Boris Sergeevich Kashin (Russian: Борис Сергеевич Кашин; born July 3, 1951, in Moscow) is a Russian mathematician, Academician of the Russian Academy of Sciences (since 2011), Doctor of Sciences, Professor at the MSU Faculty of Mechanics and Mathematics. Member of the Central Committee of the Communist Party of the Russian Federation since 2000.

He graduated from the MSU Faculty of Mechanics and Mathematics in 1973. And then entered to the Steklov Mathematical Institute, where he currently works.

In 1976 he defended his Candidate's Dissertation. In 1977 he defended his doctoral dissertation. In 1990 he received the title of Professor.

Member of the Communist Party of the Soviet Union since 1980. He was elected a corresponding member of the Russian Academy of Sciences in 1997.

He is currently Editor-in-Chief of the journal Matematicheskii Sbornik.

In 2012, as a deputy of the State Duma, Kashin was among the initiators of the bill of the Dima Yakovlev law.
