= Johan Jakob Nervander =

Finnish poet, physicist and meteorologist (1805–1848)

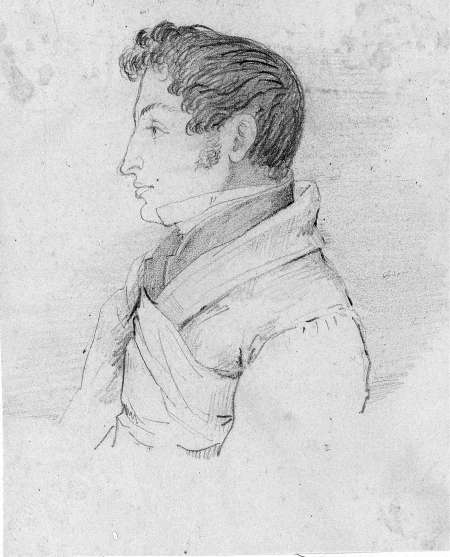
- Born: 23 February 1805; Uusikaupunki
- Died: 15 March 1848 (aged 43); Helsinki
- Awards: Demidov Prize
- Scientific career
- Fields: Physics

Johan Jakob Nervander (23 February 1805 – 15 March 1848) was a Finnish poet, physicist, and meteorologist.

He was born to Johan Nervander, a pharmacist in Uusikaupunki, and his wife Beata Bergbom. In 1820, Nervander became a student at the Royal Academy of Turku where he was a friend of Johan Ludvig Runeberg.

During the period 1832-1836, Nervander went on a long journey to central and southern Europe, funded by a scholarship for traveling awarded by the Royal Academy of Turku. During this journey, he became interested in geomagnetism upon meeting Wilhelm Eduard Weber and Carl Friedrich Gauss in Göttingen on his travels in Central Europe.

From Stockholm, he returned to Helsinki through Saint Petersburg. In Saint Petersburg, he met the academician Adolph Theodor Kupffer, the director of the Saint Petersburg Academy of Sciences, who supported Nervander's idea to have a magnetic observatory established in Helsinki. The new, necessary houses were built in Kaisaniemi Park, Helsinki, and Nervander was appointed the first director of the observatory. Starting from 1844, the Helsinki data series (1844–1912) is one of the oldest systematic geomagnetic observation series in the world.

In 1846, he was appointed professor in physics at the University of Helsinki, succeeding Gustaf Gabriel Hällström. In 1848, he fell ill with smallpox and died in the same year. After Nervander's death, Henrik Gustaf Borenius continued as director at the observatory.

== Publications ==
- In doctrinam electro-magnetismi momenta (1829)
- De curvarum in genere tertii ordinis osculatrice (1832)
- Sång i anledning af första Philosophie Magister-promotionen i Helsingfors den 21 Junii 1832 (1832)
- Helsning, tillegnad de med Allernådigste tillstädjelse den 21 Junii 1836 vid Kejserliga Alexanders-Universitetet i Finland promoverade sextio Philosophie Magistrar (1836)
- Jephtas bok (1840)
- Untersuchungen über die tägliche Veränderung der magnetischen Declination (1840-41)
- Kurs i arithmetiken för elementarläroverken uti storfurstendömet Finland enligt nådigt förordnande utg (1844)
- Minnes-tal öfver Gustaf Gabriel Hällström (1847)
- Observations faites à l'observatoire magnétique et météorologique de Helsingfors, sous la directions de J.J. Nervander (1850-52)
- Skrifter (1850)
