= David Chubinashvili =

- დავით ჩუბინაშვილი
- Born: September 26, 1814; Tbilisi, Georgia, Russian Empire
- Died: June 5, 1891 (aged 76); Saint Petersburg, Russian Empire
- Occupations: Lexicologist, linguist, and scholar

David Chubinashvili (Georgian: დავით ჩუბინაშვილი; September 26, 1814 – June 5, 1891), otherwise known as David Yesseevich Chubinov (or Tchoubinoff, Russian: Давид Йессеевич Чубинов) by the Russified form of his name, was a Georgian lexicographer, linguist, and scholar of old Georgian literature.

== Biography ==
Chubinashvili was born in Tiflis, then part of Georgia Governorate of the Russian Empire. Having graduated from the University of St. Petersburg in 1839, he later lectured there on Georgian language, rising to the rank of professor. He helped establish the Department of Georgian Language and Literature and chaired it from 1855 to 1871. He was elected to the Imperial Geographic and Imperial Archaeological Societies and participated in the Tbilisi-based Society for the Spreading of Literacy Among Georgians (SSLG).

He wrote literary criticism for the Russian and Georgian press, authored several works on Georgian language and literature, and published Shota Rustaveli and other classics of old Georgian literature. Chubinov was twice awarded the Demidov Prize for compiling Georgian-Russian-French and Russian-Georgian dictionaries in 1840 and 1846 respectively. He bequeathed his rich collection of Georgian manuscripts to the SSLG.

Chubinov died on June 5, 1891, at the age of 76. He was interred at Nikolskoe Cemetery. His tomb featured Georgian inscriptions, which are now barely visible and almost completely faded.

== See also ==
- List of lexicographers
