= Mikhail Marov =

Russian astronomer (1933–2023)

Mikhail Yakovlevich Marov
- Михаил Яковлевич Маров
- Born: July 28, 1933; Moscow, USSR
- Died: November 30, 2023 (aged 90); Moscow, Russia
- Burial place: Troyekurovskoye Cemetery (Section 4)
- Education: Bauman Moscow State Technical University
- Occupation: Astronomer
- Employer(s): Keldysh Institute of Applied Mathematics, Vernadsky Institute of Geochemistry and Analytical Chemistry

Mikhail Yakovlevich Marov (Russian: Михаил Яковлевич Маров; 28 July 1933 – 30 November 2023) was a Russian astronomer, academician of the Russian Academy of Sciences (2008) and laureate of the Lenin Prize (1970). He was born in Moscow on 28 July 1933, and died on 30 November 2023, at the age of 90.

== Life ==
Marov graduated from the Bauman Moscow State Technical University in 1958 with a degree in mechanics. He then studied at the Obninsk Institute of Physics and Power Engineering and worked for RSC Energia. From 1962 he worked at the Institute of Applied Mathematics. From 1964 he was a doctoral candidate in Physical and Mathematical Sciences, and from 1967 head of the Department of Applied Mechanics, Aeronomy, and Planetary Physics. He gained his doctorate in 1970 with the dissertation "Physical Structure of the Atmosphere of Venus". He gained a professorship in 1977.

From 1966 to 1978, he was the Scientific Secretary and Deputy Chairman of the Interdepartmental Scientific and Technical Council for Space Research at the USSR Academy of Sciences.

From 1986 to 1989, he was a professor at the Moscow Institute of Geodesy, Aerial Photography, and Cartography (MIIGAiK), then from 1991 at the International Space University and from 2003 at the Kaluga State University.

Marov was Editor-in-chief of the journal "Solar System Research" (since 1980), Deputy Chairman of the Scientific Council of the USSR Academy of Sciences for Lunar and Planetary Problems, Chairman of the Solar System Section of the Astronomical Council of the USSR Academy of Sciences (since 1985), Chairman of the Academic Commission for the Study of Tsiolkovsky's Scientific Legacy and the Organizing Committee of the Tsiolkovsky Readings.

Marov became a corresponding Member of the USSR Academy of Sciences on 15 December 1990, in the Division of Mechanics and Control Processes, and Academician of the Russian Academy of Sciences (RAS) on 29 May 2008, in the Division of Earth Sciences.

From 2008 he was Head of the Department of Planetary Studies and Cosmochemistry at the V.I. Vernadsky Institute of Geochemistry and Analytical Chemistry of the Russian Academy of Sciences.

He headed the RAS Commission for the Study of the Creative Legacy of K.E. Tsiolkovsky; until 2019, he was a member of the Bureau of the RAS Council on Space, and until 2020, Deputy Chairman of the RAS Scientific Council for Astrobiology. He was a Full Member of the International Academy of Astronautics, member of the International Astronomical Union and of the Royal Astronomical Society. He was also an Honorary Citizen of Providence, Rhode Island, USA (1988).

Asteroid 10264 (discovered in 1978 by Nikolai Chernykh) is named Marov in his honour.

In August 2023, following the failure of the Luna 25 mission, he was hospitalized. The scientist, who had celebrated his 90th birthday, had high hopes that the new, Russia-first lunar mission, which was intended to bridge the gap between the Soviet and Russian lunar programs, would be successful: "It's sad that we failed to land the spacecraft. For me, this was probably the last hope of seeing a revival of our lunar programme," he said in an interview with MK.

== Research ==
Marov's research interests included space mechanics and physics, astrophysics, planetology, solar system studies, and mathematical modelling of space and natural environments.

His primary work was in the field of experimental planetary astronomy, studying the structure, dynamics, optical characteristics and thermal regime of planetary atmospheres. He was one of the initiators and scientific directors of the Soviet Venus exploration programme using the Venera series of unmanned interplanetary probes. He participated in the first direct measurements of atmospheric parameters and determined the temperature and pressure values at the surface of Venus. He studied the thermodynamic state of gas in the Venusian atmosphere and identified a number of important dynamic characteristics related to heat exchange and planetary circulation. He participated in an experiment on the descent module of the Mars 6 unmanned interplanetary probe, which conducted the first direct measurements of Martian atmospheric parameters. In the field of upper atmospheric physics (aeronomy), he conducted an extensive series of studies on the structure and dynamics of the Earth's thermosphere, identifying a number of new effects and obtaining quantitative estimates for them. He proposed original approaches to modelling the structure and physicochemical processes in the upper atmospheres of planets using methods of multicomponent radiation hydrodynamics and chemical kinetics, as well as to the study of nonequilibrium elementary processes using statistical methods in solving kinetic equations.

Marov played a leading role in the study of near-Earth space, the Moon, and the planets of the Solar System. He made significant contributions to the development of the theoretical foundations of aeronomy, the mechanics of multicomponent turbulent reacting gases and inhomogeneous multiphase media, the study of nonequilibrium kinetic processes, and the development of original methods for mathematical modelling of planetary atmospheres, comets, and their gaseous envelopes, as well as migration-collision processes in space.

He took an active part in the work carried out as part of the Soviet Interkosmos programme.

He authored over 250 scientific papers in Russian and international peer-reviewed journals and 15 monographs on space research, mechanics, and the physics of space environments.

== Bibliography ==
- Kuzmin, A.D.; Marov, M.Ya. (1974). Fizika Planety Venera Физика Планеты Венера [Physics of the Planet Venus] (in Russian). Moscow: Nauka.
- Marov, M.Ya. (1981). Planety Solnechnoy Sistemy Планеты Солнечной Системы [Planets of the Solar System] (in Russian). Moscow: Nauka.
  - 2nd edition, 1986.
  - 3rd edition (reprint of 2nd edition), Masterpieces of popular science literature (astronomy) No. 210, URSS, 2020. ISBN 978-5-9710-7457-1
- Keldysh, M.V.; Marov, M.Ya. (1981). Kosmicheskiye Issledovaniya Космические Исследования [Space Research] (in Russian). Moscow: Nauka.
- Marov, M.Ya.; Kolesnichenko, A.V. (1987). Vvedeniye v Planetnuyu Aeronomiyu Введение в планетную аэрономию [An Introduction to Planetary Aeronomy] (in Russian). Moscow: Nauka.
- Marov, M.Ya.; Grinspoon, D.H. (1998). The Planet Venus. New Haven: Yale University Press. ISBN 0-300-04975-7.
- Marov, M.Ya.; Shematovich, V.I.; Bisikalo, D.V.; Gérard, J.-C., eds. (1997). Nonequilibrium Processes in the Planetary and Cometary Atmospheres: Theory and Applications. Astrophysics and Space Science Library. Vol. 217. Kluwer. eISSN 2214-7985. ISBN 0-7923-4686-6. ISSN 0067-0057.
- Kolesnichenko, A.V.; Marov, M.Ya. (1998). Turbulentnost' Mnogokomponentnykh Sred Турбулентность многокомпонентных сред [Turbulence of Multicomponent Media] (in Russian). Moscow: Nauka-Interperiodika.
- Marov, M.Ya.; Rickman, H., eds. (2001). Collisional Processes in the Solar System. Astrophysics and Space Science Library. Vol. 261. Springer. doi:10.1007/978-94-010-0712-2. eISSN 2214-7985. ISBN 0-7923-6946-7. ISSN 0067-0057.
- Marov, M.Ya.; Kolesnichenko, A.V. (2001). Mechanics of Turbulence of Multicomponent Gases. Astrophysics and Space Science Library. Vol. 269. Dordrecht/Boston/London: Kluwer. doi:10.1007/0-306-48092-1. eISSN 2214-7985. ISBN 1-4020-0103-7. ISSN 0067-0057.
- Fridman, A.M.; Marov, M.Ya.; Miller, R.H., eds. (2002). Observational Manifestation of Chaos in Astrophysical Objects - Invited talks for a workshop held in Moscow, Sternberg Astronomical Institute, 28-29 August 2000. Springer. doi:10.1007/978-94-010-0247-9. ISBN 978-94-010-3945-1. Reprinted from Space Science Reviews 102(1-4), 2002.
- Fridman, A.M.; Marov, M.Ya.; Kovalenko, I.G., eds. (2006). Astrophysical disks - Collective and Stochastic Phenomena. Astrophysics and Space Science Library. Vol. 337. Springer. doi:10.1007/1-4020-4348-1. eISSN 2214-7985. ISBN 978-1-4020-4347-5. ISSN 0067-0057.
- Huntress, W.T.; Marov, M.Ya. (2011). Soviet Robots in the Solar System - Mission Technologies and Discoveries. Springer-Praxis. doi:10.1007/978-1-4419-7898-1.
  - Marov, M.Ya.; Huntress, W.T. (2017). Sovetskiye roboty v solnechnoy sisteme : tekhnologii i otkrytiya Советские роботы в солнечной системе - технологии и открытия [Soviet Robots in the Solar System - Technologies and Discoveries] (in Russian) (2nd ed.). Moscow: Fizmatlit. ISBN 978-5-9221-1741-8.
- Marov, M.Ya.; Kolesnichenko, A.V. (2013). Turbulence and Self-Organization - Modeling Astrophysical Objects. Springer. doi:10.1007/978-1-4614-5155-6. ISBN 978-1-4614-5154-9.
- Marov, M.Ya. (2015). The Fundamentals of Modern Astrophysics - A Survey of the Cosmos from the Home Planet to Space Frontiers. Springer. doi:10.1007/978-1-4614-8730-2. ISBN 978-1-4614-8729-6.
- Marov, M.Ya. (2016). Kosmos - ot Solnechnoy Sistemy vglub' Vselennoy Космос : от Солнечной системы вглубь Вселенной [Space: From the Solar System to the Depths of the Universe] (in Russian). Moscow: Fizmatlit. ISBN 978-5-9221-1711-1.
  - 2nd edition, 2018. ISBN 978-5-9221-1795-1
  - 3rd edition, 2021. ISBN 978-5-9221-1911-5
- Marov, M.Ya. (2021). Slovo ob Uchitele: akademik Mstislav Vsevolodovich Keldysh Слово об Учителе: академик Мстислав Всеволодович Келдыш [A Word about the Teacher: Academician Mstislav Vsevolodovich Keldysh] (in Russian). Moscow: Fizmatlit. ISBN 978-5-9221-1904-7.
- Marov, M.Ya.; Shevchenko, I.I. (2022). Ekzoplanety: Fizika, dinamika, kosmogoniya Экзопланеты: Физика, динамика, космогония [Exoplanets: Physics, Dynamics, and Cosmogony] (in Russian). Moscow: Fizmatlit. ISBN 978-5-9221-1955-9.

== Awards and honors ==
- Lenin Prize (1970)
- Prix Galabert der Société Française d'astronautique (1973)
- USSR State Prize (1980)
- IAA Basic Science Book Award (2012) — with W.T. Huntress, for Soviet Robots in the Solar System - Mission Technologies and Discoveries (2011)
- Recognition by the NASA Planetary Science Division on the 50th anniversary of the exploration of the solar system (2012)
- Alvin Seiff Award (2013)
- COSPAR William Nordberg Medal (2014)
- Demidov Prize (2015)
- Order of Honour (2015)
- Order of Friendship (2015)
- Keldysh Medal of the Russian Academy of Sciences (2016)
- Order of Alexander Nevsky (2021)

== See Also ==
- Marov, M.Ya. (2015). "O Sebe i Epokhe: Istoricheskiy Ekskurs" О Себе и Эпохе: Исторический Экскурс [About Myself and Epoch: Historical Overview] (PDF). In Zakharov, A.V. (ed.). Issledovaniya Solnechnoy Sistemy: kosmicheskiye vekhi Исследования Солнечной системы: космические вехи [Solar System Study: Some Milestones] (PDF) (in Russian). Moscow: IKI RAN. pp. 10–36. ISSN 2075-6836. Archived (PDF) from the original on 25 July 2025.
- Chetverushkin, B.N.; Aptekarev, A.I.; Kolesnichenko, A.V.; Mazhukin, V.I.; Osipov, V.P. (2019). "Space is the Destiny: Research of the Solar System. On the occasion of the 85-th anniversary of academician RAS M. Ya. Marov". Mathematica Montisnigri. 46. Keldysh Institute of Applied Mathematics: 165–201. doi:10.20948/mathmontis-2019-46-15.
- Aptekarev, A.I., Balega, Y.Yu., Bisikalo, D.V., Bondur, V.G., Zelenyi, L.M., Petrukovich, A.A., Sadovnichy, V.A., Solov’ev, V.A., Sunyaev, R.A., Cherepashchuk, A.M., Chetverushkin, B.N., Shustov, B.M. (June 2023). "Mikhail Yakovlevich Marov (on his 90th birthday)". Physics-Uspekhi. 66 (07). Uspekhi Fizicheskikh Nauk (UFN) Journal: 747–749. doi:10.3367/ufne.2023.06.039374.
