= Leonid Leibenson =

Soviet physicist (1879–1951)

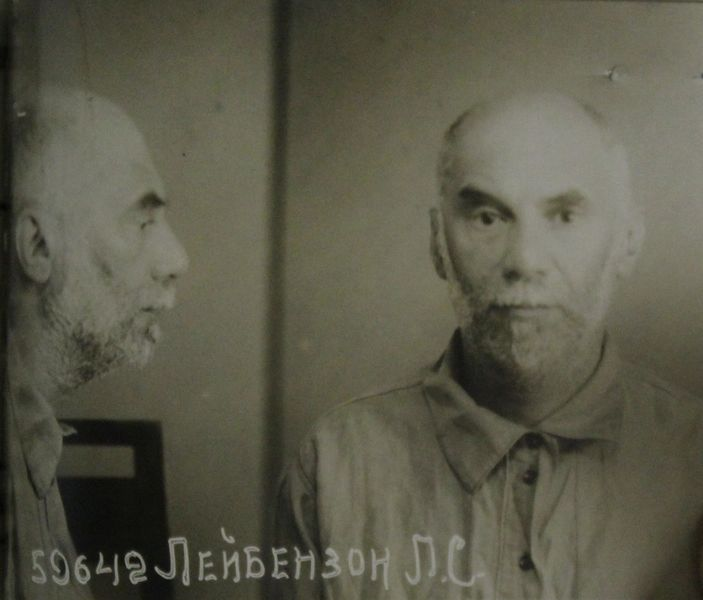
- Prison record photograph, c. 1936
- Born: 14 June 1879 (in Julian calendar), 14 June 1879; Kharkiv
- Died: 15 March 1951 (aged 71); Moscow (Soviet Union)
- Alma mater: Moscow State University
- Occupation: Physicist

Leonid Samuilovich Leibenson or Leybenzon (Russian: Леонид Самуилович Лейбензон; 26 June, 1879 – 15 March, 1951) was a Russian and Soviet physicist who worked on fluid dynamics. The Leibenson equation named after him describes the flow of liquids through porous media. He helped establish research on petrochemical fluid research, developed the first Soviet wind tunnel and worked on mathematical approaches to study boundary layers in fluid dynamics.

== Biography ==
Leybenzon was born in Kharkiv where his father Samuil Lvovich was a physician. Educated at the Tula classical gymnasium he went to Moscow to study at the technical school. His teacher Nikolay Zhukovsky suggested that he studied aerodynamics and he graduated in 1906. In 1908 he became an associate professor in applied mathematics at the Moscow University. In 1911 he protested the policy of Lev Kasso and quit university to work on oil storage and piping with Vladimir Shukhov. Using seismic evidence he suggested that the Earth's interior was fluid in 1911. He then taught at Tiflis from 1913 and at Dorpat (Tartu) from 1915. He received a doctorate and became a professor at the University of Tartu. After the Russian Revolution he became a professor at the Georgian University at Tbilisi and in 1921 became dean of at the Baku Polytechnic. He returned to Moscow in 1922 and from 1932 he was associated with the Aerohydrodynamic Institute working on aerodynamics working on the stability of elastic shells. In 1936 he was arrested on political charges by the NKVD and was exiled to Kazakhstan along with his wife. Living in Akhtubinsk, he moved later to Temir, and taught at a school, while also working on mathematical methods to examine airflow. His release was sought by Sergey Chaplygin and he was acquitted in 1939. He returned to Moscow and joined the Institute of Geophysics. Here he examined tidal forces, and the elasticity of the Earth's crust. In 1945 he became head of the department of hydrodynamics.
