= Demidov Prize =

Russian national scientific prize

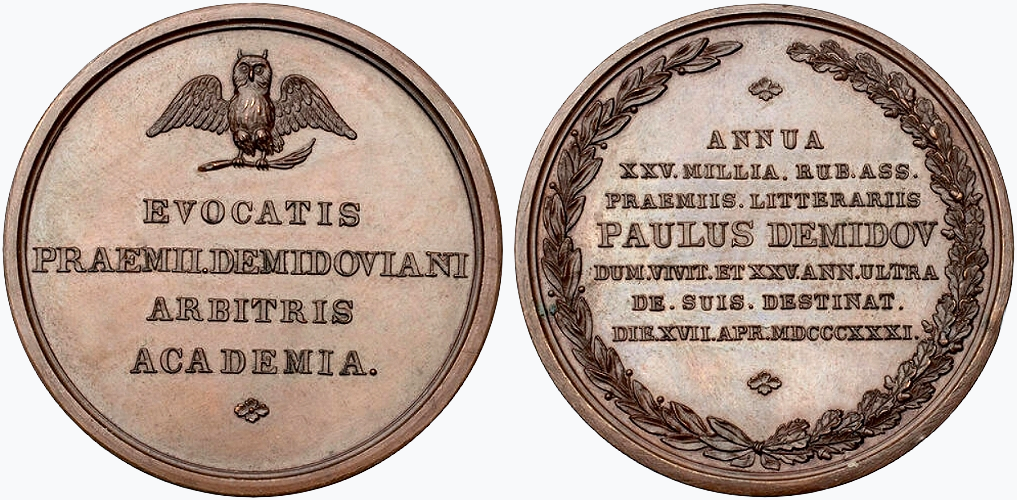
- Medallion of Demidov Prize Award
- Awarded for: national scientific prize in Russia (1832-1866)
- Country: Russian Empire
- Presented by: Imperial Academy of Sciences
- Reward: A Bronze medal
- First award: 1831

The Demidov Prize (Russian: Демидовская премия) is a national scientific prize in Russia awarded annually to the members of the Russian Academy of Sciences. Originally awarded from 1832 to 1866 in the Russian Empire. In its original incarnation it was one of the first annual scientific awards, and its traditions influenced other awards of this kind including the Nobel Prize.

It was revived by the government of Russia's Sverdlovsk Oblast in 1993, as the "Demidov Prize of the Scientific Demidov Foundation".

== History ==
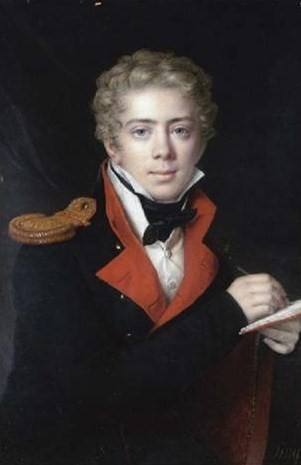
Pavel Nikolaievich Demidov, the founder of the prize

In 1831 Count Pavel Nikolaievich Demidov, representative of the famous Demidov family, established a scientific prize in his name. The Saint Petersburg Academy of Sciences (now the Russian Academy of Sciences) was chosen as the awarding institution. In 1832 the president of the Petersburg Academy of Sciences, Sergei Uvarov, awarded the first prizes.

From 1832 to 1866 the Academy awarded 55 full prizes (5,000 rubles) and 220 part prizes. Among the winners were many prominent Russian scientists: the founder of field surgery and inventor of the plaster immobilisation method in treatment of fractures, Nikolai Pirogov; the seafarer and geographer Adam Johann von Krusenstern, who led the first russian circumnavigation of the globe; Dmitri Mendeleev, the creator of the periodic table of elements; Boris Jacobi, pioneer of the first usable electric motors; and many others. One of the recipients was the founder's younger brother, Count Anatoly Nikolaievich Demidov, 1st Prince of San Donato, in 1847; Pavel had died in 1840, making Anatoly the Count Demidov (note that Russia did not recognize Anatoly's Italian title of prince).

From 1866, 25 years after Count Demidov's death, as was according to the terms of his bequest, there were no more awards.

In 1993, on the initiative of the vice-president of the Russian Academy of Sciences Gennady Mesyats and the governor of the Sverdlovsk Oblast Eduard Rossel, the Demidov Prize traditions were restored. The prize is awarded for outstanding achievements in natural sciences and humanities. The winners are elected annually among the members of the Russian Academy of Sciences. According to the tradition every year the Demidov Scientific Foundation chooses three or four academicians to receive the award. The prize includes a medal, a diploma and $10,000. The awards ceremony takes place every year at the Governor's Palace of Sverdlovsk Oblast, in Yekaterinburg, Russia. The recipients of the Prize also give lectures at the Ural State University (Demidov Lecture).

== Winners (1832-1866) ==
Year	Portrait	Recipient(s)	Field(s)	Ref
1832		Magnus Georg Paucker	Physics	
1832		Julius Hagemeister	Economics	
1833		Aleksandr Vostokov	Philology	
1833		Carl Philipp Reiff	Philology	
1835		Fr Theodore Sidonsky	Philosophy	
1835		Archimandrite Hyacinth (Nikita Bichurin)	History	
1835		Pyotr Sokolov	Philology	
1836		Friedrich Benjamin Lütke	Geography	
1836		Nikolaus Braschmann	Mathematics	
1836		Alexander Mikhailovsky-Danilevsky	History	
1837		Adam Johann von Krusenstern	Geography	
1837		Friedrich Wilhelm Argelander	Astronomy	
1837		Nikolay Ustryalov	History	
1838		Stanislav Chaudoir	History	
1839		Archimandrite Hyacinth (Nikita Bichurin)	Philology	
1839		Alexander Kazembek	Philology	
1839		Nikolai Medem	Military sciences	
1840		Mikhail Pogodin	Philology	
1840		David Chubinashvili	Philology	
1840		Boris Jacobi	Physics	
1841		Alexander Postels	Biology	
1841		Franz Josef Ruprecht	Biology	
1842		Ferdinand von Wrangel	Geography	
1844		Chaim Zelig Slonimski	Inventions	
1844		Aleksandr Vostokov	Philology	
1844		Fr Gerasim Pavsky	Philology	
1844		Nikolai Pirogov	Medicine	
1845		Friedrich von Adelung	Geography	
1846		Aleksey Savich	Astronomy	
1846		Józef Kowalewski	Philology	
1846		Karl Ernst Claus	Chemistry	
1847		Alexander Keyserling	Geography	
1847		Paul von Krusenstern	Geography	
1847		Count Anatoly Demidov	Geography	
1847		Dmitry Tolstoy	History	
1847		David Chubinashvili	Philology	
1848		Johan Jakob Nervander	Meteorology	
1849		Pafnuty Chebyshev	Mathematics	
1850		Fyodor Goremykin	Military sciences	
1851		Nikolai Pirogov	Medicine	
1851		Michael Reinecke	Geography	
1852		Konstantin Nevolin	History	
1852		Loggin Seddeler	Military sciences	
1853		Dmitry Milyutin	History	
1854		Metropolitan Macarius (Mikhail Bulgakov)	Theology	
1854		Konstantin Nevolin	History	
1855		Dmitrii Ivanovich Zhuravskii	Technical sciences	
1857		Nikolai Turchaninov	Biology	
1857		Heinz Christian Pander	Geography	
1858		Iosif Goshkevich	Philology	
1859		Carl Johann Maximovich	Biology	
1860		Nikolai Pirogov	Medicine	
1860		Fyodor Dmitriyev	Law	
1861		Pyotr Pekarsky	Philology	
1861		Modest Bogdanovich	History	
1862		Modest von Korff	History	
1862		Dmitri Mendeleev	Chemistry	
1863		Grigory Butakov	Maritime sciences	
1865		Friedrich von Smitt	History	
1865		Ludwig Schwarz	Geodesy	

== Prize of the Scientific Demidov Foundation ==
Year	Portrait	Recipient(s)	Field(s)	Ref
1993		Sergei Vonsovsky	Physics	
1993		Nikolay Kochetkov	Chemistry	
1993		Boris Chesnokov	Geology	
1993		Valentin Yanin	History	
1993		Anatoly Karpov	Economics	
1994		Boris Rauschenbach	Mechanics	
1994		Aleksandr Bayev	Biology	
1994		Pyotr Kropotkin	Geology	
1994		Nikita Tolstoy	Philology	
1995		Andrei Viktorovich Gaponov-Grekhov	Physics	
1995		Genrich Tolstikov	Chemistry	
1995		Vladimir Magnitsky	Geophysics	
1995		Nikolai Pokrovsky	History	
1996		Nikolay Krasovsky	Mathematics and mechanics	
1996		Vladimir Sokolov	Biology	
1996		Georgy Golitsyn	Earth sciences	
1996		Yevgeni Chelyshev	Philology	
1997		Alexander Skrinsky	Physics	
1997		Nikolay Vatolin	Chemistry	
1997		Nikolai Laverov	Earth sciences	
1997		Andrey Zaliznyak	Linguistics	
1998		Oleg Gazenko	Biology	
1998		Andre Gonchar	Mathematics	
1998		Valentin Sedov	History	
1998		Nikolai Yushkin	Earth sciences	
1999		Zhores Alferov	Physics	
1999		Nikolai Dobretsov	Earth sciences	
1999		Vladimir Tartakovsky	Chemistry	
2000		Victor Maslov	Mathematics	
2000		Nikolai Semikhatov	Mechanics	
2000		Rem Petrov	Earth sciences	
2000		Tatyana Zaslavskaya	Economics and sociology	
2001		Aleksandr Prokhorov	Physics	
2001		Viktor Kabanov	Chemistry	
2001		Igor Gramberg	Earth sciences	
2002		Ludvig Faddeev	Mathematics	
2002		Viktor Savelyev	Medicine	
2002		Vladimir Kudryavtsev	Law	
2002		Gennady Mesyats	Physics	
2003		Boris Wassiljewitsch Litwinow	Physics	
2003		Irina Beletskaya	Chemistry	
2003		Oleg Bogatikov	Earth sciences	
2004		Gury Marchuk	Mathematics	
2004		Vladimir Bolshakov	Biology	
2004		Anatoly Derevyanko	History and archeology	
2005		Oleg Krokhin	Physics	
2005		Nikolai Lyakishev	Physicochemistry	
2005		Alexei Kontorovich	Earth sciences	
2006		Timur Eneev	Mathematics	
2006		Veniamin Alekseyev	History	
2006		Vladimir Kulakov	Medicine	
2007		Boris Kovalchuk	Physics	
2007		Oleg Chupakhin	Chemistry	
2007		Mikhail Ivanovich Kuzmin	Earth science	
2008		Yevgeny Mishchenko	Mathematics	
2008		Anatoly Grigoriev	Medicine	
2008		Valery Makarov	Economics	
2009		Yury Kagan	Physics	
2009		Dmitry Rundkvist	Earth science	
2009		Yury Tretyakov	Chemistry	
2009		Alexey Olovnikov	Biology	
2010		Yury Osipov	Mathematics	
2010		Gennady Sakovich	Chemistry	
2010		Serhiy Alexeyev	Humanities	
2011		Alexander Andreev	Physics	
2011		Yury Zhuravlyov	Biology	
2011		Vladimir Kotlyakov	Earth science	
2012		Yevgeny Primakov	Social science	
2012		Ilya Moiseev	Chemistry	
2012		Yevgeny Avrorin	Physics	
2013		Yuri Yershov	Mathematics	
2013		Alexander Spirin	Biology	
2013		Kliment Troubetzkoy	Mining	
2014		Nikolai Kardashev	astrophysics	
2014		Oleg Nefyodov	chemistry	
2014		Bagrat Sandukhadze	Wheat breeding	
2015		Mikhail Marov	Space exploration	
2015		Rostislav Karpov	Cardiology	
2015		Viktor Koroteyev	Palaeovolcanology	
2016		Yury A. Zolotov	Analytical chemistry	
2016		Vyacheslav Molodin	Archaeology	
2016		Valery Rubakov	Fundamental physics	
2017		Vladimir Fortov	Physics	
2017		Gennady Alekseyevich Romanenko	Agrarian sciences	
2017		Vladimir Skulachev	Bioenergetics	
2019		Yuri Oganessian	Nuclear physics	
2019		Alexander Chibilev		
2019		Vyacheslav Rozhnov		
2019		Eduard Rossel		
2020		Viktor Sadovnichiy	Mathematics	
2020		Leopold Igorevich Leontiev	Metallurgy	
2020		Anatoly Torkunov	International relations	

== See also ==
- List of general science and technology awards
- List of biology awards
- List of chemistry awards
- List of mathematics awards
- List of physics awards
