= Nikolai Brashman =

Russian mathematician (1796–1866)

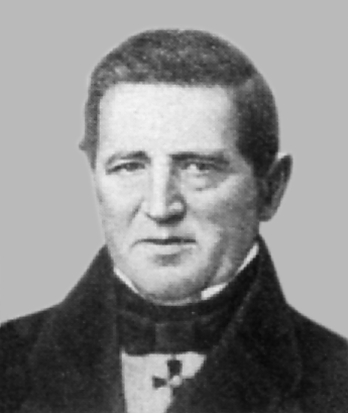
- Nikolai Dmitrievich Brashman
- Born: June 14, 1796; Neu-Raußnitz, Austrian Empire
- Died: May 25, 1866 (aged 69); Moscow, Russian Empire
- Education: University of Vienna; Vienna Polytechnic Institute
- Known for: Contributions to mechanics and analytical geometry
- Awards: Demidov Prize (1836)
- Scientific career
- Fields: Mathematics
- Workplaces: Kazan University; St Petersburg University; Imperial Moscow University
- Doctoral advisor: Joseph von Littrow
- Other academic advisors: Nikolai Lobachevsky
- Notable students: Pafnuty Chebyshev; August Davidov; Osip Somov

Nikolai Dmitrievich Brashman (Russian: Никола́й Дми́триевич Брáшман; German: Nikolaus Braschmann; June 14, 1796 – 25 May [O.S. 13 May] 1866) was a Russian mathematician of Jewish-Austrian origin. He was a student of Joseph Johann Littrow, and the advisor of Pafnuty Chebyshev and August Davidov.

He was born in Neu-Raußnitz (today Rousínov in Czech Republic, then in Austrian Empire) and studied at the University of Vienna and Vienna Polytechnic Institute. In 1824 he moved to Saint Petersburg and then accepted a position at the Kazan University. In 1834 he became a professor of applied mathematics at the Moscow University. There he is best remembered as a founder of the Moscow Mathematical Society and its journal Matematicheskii Sbornik.

For his mechanics textbook, in 1836 Brashman was awarded the Demidov Prize by the Russian Academy of Sciences. The academy elected him a corresponding member in 1855. He died in Moscow in 1866.

== Bibliography ==
- A. Andreev; D. Tsygankov (2010). Imperial Moscow University: 1755-1917: encyclopedic dictionary. Moscow: Russian political encyclopedia (ROSSPEN). pp. 94–95. ISBN 978-5-8243-1429-8.
