= Nikolay Vatolin =

Russian metallurgist

Nikolay Anatolyevich Vatolin (13 November 1926 – 11 August 2018) was a Soviet and Russian metallurgist.

He was born in Sverdlovsk and educated at the Ural State Technical University.

He was a scientific researcher, Head of laboratory and from 1968 Director of the USSR Academy of Sciences Institute of Metallurgy (Urals Branch) from 1952 to 1998, after which he was an adviser to the Academy. He was also a professor at the Ural State Mining University from 1973.

He was a major specialist in the field of the physical chemistry of metallurgical processes. In particular, he studied the structural-sensitive properties of liquid metals and their alloys, studying their electrical properties. He carried out studies of the non-stoichiometry of oxide melts containing transition metal ions. Under his leadership, with the help of an original high-temperature diffractometer developed in the same group, he produced a series of papers on the diffraction study of the atomic structure and the nature of the interatomic interaction in metallic and oxide melts.

== Honours and awards ==
- Academician of the USSR (later Russian) Academy of Sciences, 1981
- USSR state prize, 1982 and 1991
- Kurnakow Gold Medal of the Russian Academy of Sciences, 1995
- Demidov Prize, 1997
