= Egorov's theorem =

Theorem concerning uniform convergence

In measure theory, an area of mathematics, Egorov's theorem establishes a condition for the uniform convergence of a pointwise convergent sequence of measurable functions. It is also named Severini–Egoroff theorem or Severini–Egorov theorem, after Carlo Severini, an Italian mathematician, and Dmitri Egorov, a Russian mathematician and geometer, who published independent proofs respectively in 1910 and 1911.

Egorov's theorem can be used along with compactly supported continuous functions to prove Lusin's theorem for integrable functions.

== Historical note ==
The first proof of the theorem was given by Carlo Severini in 1910: he used the result as a tool in his research on series of orthogonal functions. His work remained apparently unnoticed outside Italy, probably due to the fact that it is written in Italian, appeared in a scientific journal with limited diffusion and was considered only as a means to obtain other theorems. A year later Dmitri Egorov published his independently proved results, and the theorem became widely known under his name: however, it is not uncommon to find references to this theorem as the Severini–Egoroff theorem. The first mathematicians to prove independently the theorem in the nowadays common abstract measure space setting were Frigyes Riesz (1922, 1928), and in Wacław Sierpiński (1928): an earlier generalization is due to Nikolai Luzin, who succeeded in slightly relaxing the requirement of finiteness of measure of the domain of convergence of the pointwise converging functions in the long (242 pages) paper (Luzin 1916). Further generalizations were given much later by Pavel Korovkin, in the paper (Korovkin 1947), and by Gabriel Mokobodzki in the paper (Mokobodzki 1970): in particular Korovkin extended the result to a class of non–negative set functions more general than measures.

== Formal statement and proof ==
=== Statement ===
Let $(f_n)$ be a sequence of $M$-valued measurable functions, where $M$ is a separable metric space, on some measure space $(X,\sigma,\mu)$, and suppose there is a measurable subset $A \subseteq X$, with finite $\mu$-measure, such that $(f_n)$ converges $\mu$-almost everywhere on $A$ to a limit function $f$. The following result holds: for every $\varepsilon > 0$, there exists a measurable subset $B$ of $A$ such that $\mu (B)<\varepsilon$, and $(f_n)$ converges to $f$ uniformly on $A\setminus B$.

Here, $\mu (B)$ denotes the $\mu$-measure of $B$. In words, the theorem says that pointwise convergence almost everywhere on $A$ implies the apparently much stronger uniform convergence everywhere except on some subset $B$ of arbitrarily small measure. This type of convergence is called almost uniform convergence.

=== Discussion of assumptions and a counterexample ===
- The hypothesis $\mu (A)<\infty$ is necessary. To see this, it is simple to construct a counterexample when μ is the Lebesgue measure: consider the sequence of real-valued indicator functions
  $$f_n(x) = 1_{[n,n+1]}(x), \qquad n\in\N,\ x\in\R,$$
  defined on the real line. This sequence converges pointwise to the zero function everywhere but does not converge uniformly on $\R\setminus B$ for any set $B$ of finite measure: a counterexample in the general $n$-dimensional real vector space $\R^n$ can be constructed as shown by Cafiero (1959, p. 302).
- The separability of the metric space is needed to make sure that for $M$-valued, measurable functions $f$ and $g$, the distance $d(f(x), g(x))$ is again a measurable real-valued function of $x$.

=== Proof ===
Fix $\varepsilon > 0$. For natural numbers n and k, define the set E_{n,k} by the union

$$E_{n,k} = \bigcup_{m\ge n} \left\{ x\in A \,\Big|\, |f_m(x) - f(x)| \ge \frac1k \right\}.$$

These sets get smaller as n increases, meaning that E_{n+1,k} is always a subset of E_{n,k}, because the first union involves fewer sets. A point x, for which the sequence (f_{m}(x)) converges to f(x), cannot be in every E_{n,k} for a fixed k, because f_{m}(x) has to stay closer to f(x) than 1/k eventually. Hence by the assumption of μ-almost everywhere pointwise convergence on A,

$$\mu\left(\bigcap_{n\in\N}E_{n,k}\right)=0$$

for every k. Since A is of finite measure, we have continuity from above; hence there exists, for each k, some natural number n_{k} such that

$$\mu(E_{n_k,k}) < \frac\varepsilon{2^k}.$$

For x in this set we consider the speed of approach into the 1/k-neighbourhood of f(x) as too slow. Define

$$B = \bigcup_{k\in\N} E_{n_k,k}$$

as the set of all those points x in A, for which the speed of approach into at least one of these 1/k-neighbourhoods of f(x) is too slow. On the set difference $A\setminus B$ we therefore have uniform convergence. Explicitly, for any $\epsilon$, let $\frac 1 k < \epsilon$, then for any $n > n_k$, we have $|f_n - f| < \epsilon$ on all of $A\setminus B$.

Appealing to the sigma additivity of μ and using the geometric series, we get

$$\mu(B) \le \sum_{k\in\N} \mu(E_{n_k,k}) < \sum_{k\in\N}\frac\varepsilon{2^k}=\varepsilon.$$

== Generalizations ==
=== Luzin's version ===
Nikolai Luzin's generalization of the Severini–Egorov theorem is presented here according to Saks (1937, p. 19).

==== Statement ====
Under the same hypothesis of the abstract Severini–Egorov theorem suppose that A is the union of a sequence of measurable sets of finite μ-measure, and (f_{n}) is a given sequence of M-valued measurable functions on some measure space (X,Σ,μ), such that (f_{n}) converges μ-almost everywhere on A to a limit function f, then A can be expressed as the union of a sequence of measurable sets H, A_{1}, A_{2},... such that μ(H) = 0 and (f_{n}) converges to f uniformly on each set A_{k}.

==== Proof ====
It is sufficient to consider the case in which the set A is itself of finite μ-measure: using this hypothesis and the standard Severini–Egorov theorem, it is possible to define by mathematical induction a sequence of sets {A_{k}}_{k=1,2,...} such that

$$\mu\left (A \setminus \bigcup_{k=1}^{N} A_k \right)\leq\frac{1}{N}$$

and such that (f_{n}) converges to f uniformly on each set A_{k} for each k. Choosing

$$H=A\setminus\bigcup_{k=1}^{\infty} A_k$$

then obviously μ(H) = 0 and the theorem is proved.

=== Korovkin's version ===
The proof of the Korovkin version follows closely the version on Kharazishvili (2000, pp. 183–184), which however generalizes it to some extent by considering admissible functionals instead of non-negative measures and inequalities $\leq$ and $\geq$ respectively in conditions 1 and 2.

==== Statement ====
Let $(M,d)$ denote a separable metric space and $(X,\Sigma )$ a measurable space: consider a measurable set $A$ and a class $\mathfrak{A}$ containing $A$ and its measurable subsets such that their countable in unions and intersections belong to the same class. Suppose there exists a non-negative measure $\mu$ such that $\mu(A)$ exists and

1. $\mu(\cap A_n) = \lim \mu(A_n)$ if $A_1 \supset A_2 \supset \cdots$ with $A_n\in\mathfrak{A}$ for all $n$
2. $\mu(\cup A_n) = \lim \mu(A_n)$ if $A_1 \subset A_2 \subset \cdots$ with $\cup A_n\in\mathfrak{A}$.

If $f_n$ is a sequence of $M$-valued measurable functions converging $\mu$-almost everywhere on $A\in\mathfrak{A}$ to a limit function $f$, then there exists a subset $A^\prime$ of $A$ such that $0<\mu (A)-\mu(A^\prime)<\varepsilon$0 and where the convergence is also uniform.

==== Proof ====
Consider the indexed family of sets whose index set is the set of natural numbers $m\in\N,$ defined as follows:

$$A_{0,m}=\left\{x\in A|d(f_n(x),f(x)) \le 1\ \forall n\geq m\right\}$$

Obviously

$$A_{0,1}\subseteq A_{0,2}\subseteq A_{0,3}\subseteq\dots$$

and

$$A=\bigcup_{m\in\N}A_{0,m}$$

therefore there is a natural number m_{0} such that putting A_{0,m_{0}}=A_{0} the following relation holds true:

$$0\leq\mu(A)-\mu(A_0)\leq\varepsilon$$

Using A_{0} it is possible to define the following indexed family

$$A_{1,m}=\left\{x\in A_0\left| d(f_m(x),f(x)) \le \frac12 \ \forall n\geq m\right.\right\}$$

satisfying the following two relationships, analogous to the previously found ones, i.e.

$$A_{1,1}\subseteq A_{1,2}\subseteq A_{1,3}\subseteq\dots$$

and

$$A_0=\bigcup_{m\in\N}A_{1,m}$$

This fact enable us to define the set A_{1,m_{1}}=A_{1}, where m_{1} is a surely existing natural number such that

$$0\leq\mu(A)-\mu(A_1)\leq\varepsilon$$

By iterating the shown construction, another indexed family of set {A_{n}} is defined such that it has the following properties:

- $A_0\supseteq A_1\supseteq A_2\supseteq\cdots$
- $0\leq\mu(A)-\mu(A_m)\leq\varepsilon$ for all $m\in\N$
- for each $m\in\N$ there exists k_{m} such that for all $n \geq k_m$ then $d(f_n(x),f(x)) \le 2^{-m}$ for all $x \in A_m$

and finally putting

$$A'=\bigcup_{n\in\N}A_n$$

the thesis is easily proved.
