= Irina Beletskaya =

Russian chemist

- Ирина Белецкая
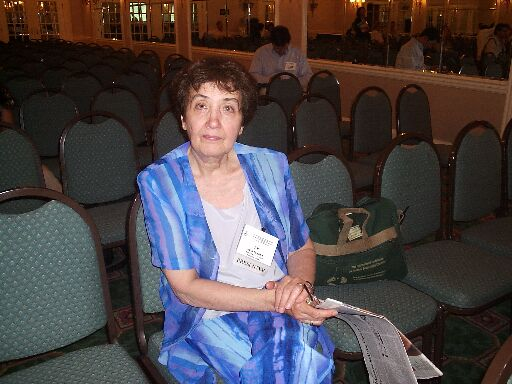
- Beletskaya in 2005
- Born: March 10, 1933 (age 93); Leningrad
- Citizenship: Russian
- Education: Moscow State University
- Known for: Studies on aromatic reaction mechanisms, palladium and nickel catalysed methods for C-C bond formation
- Awards: Lomonosov Prize (1974) Demidov Prize (2003) IUPAC 2013 Distinguished Women in Chemistry or Chemical Engineering Award (2013)
- Scientific career
- Fields: Organometallic chemistry
- Workplaces: Moscow State University

Irina Petrovna Beletskaya (Russian: Ири́на Петро́вна Беле́цкая; born 10 March 1933) is a Soviet and Russian professor of chemistry at Moscow State University. She specializes in organometallic chemistry and its application to problems in organic chemistry. She is best known for her studies on aromatic reaction mechanisms, as well as work on carbanion acidity and reactivity. She developed some of the first methods for carbon-carbon bond formation using palladium or nickel catalysts, and extended these reactions to work in aqueous media. She also helped to open up the chemistry of organolanthanides.

== Academic career ==
Beletskaya was born in Leningrad (St. Petersburg, Russia) in 1933. She graduated from the Department of Chemistry of Lomonosov Moscow State University in 1955 where she focused her undergraduate research on organoarsenic chemistry. She obtained the Candidate of Chemistry (analogous to Ph.D.) degree in 1958. For this degree she investigated electrophilic substitution reactions. More specifically, she explored the influence of ammonia on a-bromomercurophenylacetic acid reactions. In 1963 she received her Dr.Sci. degree from the same institution. In 1970 she became a Full Professor of Chemistry at Moscow State University, where she currently serves as head of the Organoelement Chemistry Laboratory. Beletskaya was elected a corresponding member of the Academy of Science of USSR in 1974. In 1992 she became a full member (academician) of the Russian Academy of Sciences. Between 1991 and 1993 she served as president of the Division of Organic Chemistry of IUPAC. Until 2001 she served on the IUPAC Committee on Chemical Weapons Destruction Technology (CWDT). She is editor-in chief of the Russian Journal of Organic Chemistry.

Beletskaya initially researched the reaction mechanisms of organic reactions, focusing on compounds with metal-carbon bonds. Her research included Grignard-like reactions and lanthanide complexes in the context of catalysts. She and Prof. O. Reutov worked on electrophilic reactions at saturated carbon. She also investigated the reaction mechanisms of organometallic compounds. She also researched carbanion reactivity, emphasizing the reactivity and structure of ion pairs. Once more advanced in her career, Beltskaya focused more on transition metal catalysts and developing economically favorable catalysts. Currently, she serves as the head of the Laboratory of Organoelement Compounds within the Department of Chemistry at Moscow State University, where she has concentrated her research on carbon dioxide utilization and its utility in renewable energy and reactions with epoxides.

== Research contributions ==
Beletskaya is known for her foundational contributions to organometallic chemistry and as one of the first prominent female chemists. Her work helped pave the way for women in Russia to participate in the scientific community. Her pioneering role in organometallic synthesis has laid an essential foundation for future organic chemists. Her work advocating for rare-earth elements in organic chemistry led to the publication of many new textbooks, changing how organic chemistry is taught everywhere. The current field of organic chemists does not always see the need to include other elements in the study of organic chemistry, as it is all carbon-based. Beletskaya’s work helps to expand the use of precious metals in organic reactions.

== Honors and awards ==
- Lomonosov Prize, 1974.
- Mendeleev Prize, 1979.
- Nesmeyanov Prize, 1991.
- Demidov Prize, 2003.
- State Prize, 2004.
- IUPAC 2013 Distinguished Women in Chemistry or Chemical Engineering Award, 2013.
