= Carlo Severini =

Italian mathematician (1872–1951)

- Born: 10 March 1872; Arcevia (Ancona)
- Died: 11 May 1951 (aged 79); Pesaro
- Education: Università di Bologna
- Known for: Severini-Egorov theorem
- Scientific career
- Fields: Real analysis
- Workplaces: Università di Bologna; University of Catania; University of Genova
- Doctoral advisor: Salvatore Pincherle

Carlo Severini (10 March 1872 – 11 May 1951) was an Italian mathematician: he was born in Arcevia (Province of Ancona) and died in Pesaro. Severini, independently from Dmitri Fyodorovich Egorov, proved and published earlier a proof of the theorem now known as Egorov's theorem.

== Biography ==
He graduated in Mathematics from the University of Bologna on November 30, 1897: the title of his "Laurea" thesis was "Sulla rappresentazione analitica delle funzioni arbitrarie di variabili reali". After obtaining his degree, he worked in Bologna as an assistant to the chair of Salvatore Pincherle until 1900. From 1900 to 1906, he was a senior high school teacher, first teaching in the Institute of Technology of La Spezia and then in the lyceums of Foggia and of Turin; then, in 1906 he became full professor of Infinitesimal Calculus at the University of Catania. He worked in Catania until 1918, then he went to the University of Genova, where he stayed until his retirement in 1942.

== Work ==
He authored more than 60 papers, mainly in the areas of real analysis, approximation theory and partial differential equations, according to Tricomi (1962). His main contributions belong to the following fields of mathematics:

=== Approximation theory ===
In this field, Severini proved a generalized version of the Weierstrass approximation theorem. Precisely, he extended the original result of Karl Weierstrass to the class of bounded locally integrable functions, which is a class including particular discontinuous functions as members.

=== Measure theory and integration ===
Severini proved Egorov's theorem one year earlier than Dmitri Egorov in the paper (Severini 1910, pp. 3–4), whose main theme is nevertheless the study of sequences of orthogonal functions and their properties.

=== Partial differential equations ===
Severini proved an existence theorem for the Cauchy problem for the non linear hyperbolic partial differential equation of first order

$$\left\{
\begin{array}{lc}
\frac{\partial u}{\partial x}=f\left(x,y,u,\frac{\partial u}{\partial y}\right) & (x,y)\in\mathbb{R}^+\times[a,b]\\
u(0,y)=U(y) & y\in[a,b]\Subset\mathbb{R}
\end{array}\right.,$$

assuming that the Cauchy data $U$ (defined in the bounded interval $[a,b]$) and that the function $f$ has Lipschitz continuous first order partial derivatives, jointly with the obvious requirement that the set $\{(x,y,z,p)=(0,y,U(y),U^\prime(y));y\in[a,b]\}$ is contained in the domain of $f$.

=== Real analysis and unfinished works ===
According to Straneo (1952, p. 99), he worked also on the foundations of the theory of real functions. Severini also left an unpublished and unfinished treatise on the theory of real functions, whose title was planned to be "Fondamenti dell'analisi nel campo reale e i suoi sviluppi".

== Selected publications ==
- Severini, Carlo (1897) [1897-1898], "Sulla rappresentazione analitica delle funzioni reali discontinue di variabile reale" [On the analytic representation of discontinuous real functions of a real variable], Atti della Reale Accademia delle Scienze di Torino. (in Italian), 33: 1002–1023, JFM 29.0354.02. In this paper Severini extends the standard Weierstrass approximation theorem to a wider class of functions characterised by the fact that they can have a particular kind of discontinuities.
- Severini, C. (1910), "Sulle successioni di funzioni ortogonali" [On sequences of orthogonal functions], Atti dell'Accademia Gioenia, serie 5^{a} (in Italian), 3 (5): Memoria XIII, 1–7, JFM 41.0475.04. This paper contains Severini's most known and cited result, i.e. the Severini–Egorov theorem.

== See also ==
- Hyperbolic partial differential equation
- Orthogonal functions
- Severini-Egorov theorem
- Weierstrass approximation theorem
