= Boleslav Mlodzeevskii =

Russian mathematician

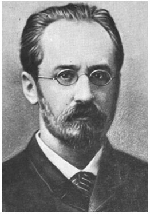
Boleslav Mlodzeevskii

Boleslav Kornelievich Mlodzeevskii, also Mlodzievskii (Russian: Болеслав Корнелиевич Млодзиевский, Pre-Reform Russian: Млодзѣевскій; born July 10 [O.S. June 28] 1858, died January 18, 1923) was a Russian mathematician, a former president of the Moscow Mathematical Society. He was working in differential and algebraic geometry.

== Biography ==
Mlodzeevskii was born in Moscow July 10, 1858. His father was a doctor, a professor at Moscow University; he died when Boleslav was seven. After finishing Moscow gymnasium with a gold medal, he studied at Moscow University, where he received a Ph.D. degree in mathematics in 1886, in differential geometry. In his dissertation he studied the problem of deformation of surfaces; his advisor was Vasily Zinger. After two years of studies and work in Göttingen, Paris and Zürich, he return to Moscow to assume a professorship at Moscow University. With a short gap 1911-1917 when he was forced to leave, he continued working at the university until his death.

He died from diabetes complications in 1923 in Moscow.

== Literary references ==
In an Andrei Bely fictional novel Moscow Under Siege, a mathematician named Boleslav Kornielich Mlodzievskii makes an appearance at a meeting of the Moscow Mathematical Society.
