= Gilberto Severini =

Italian writer (1941– 2025)

Gilberto Severini (1941 – 16 July 2025) was an Italian writer.

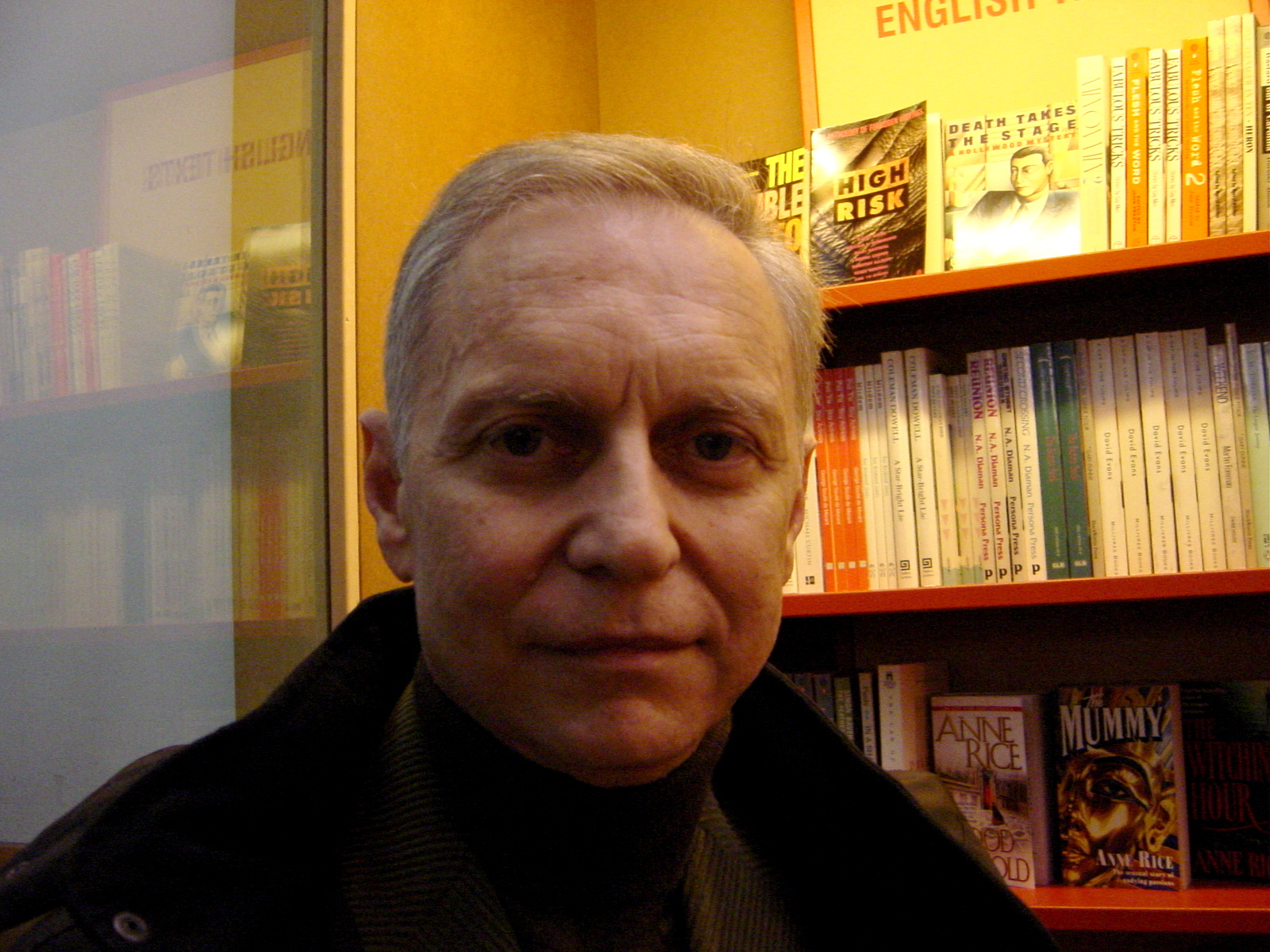
Severini in 2002

== Life and career ==
Gilberto Severini was born in 1941 in Osimo, in the Marche region. He produced his first book in 1978 with the collection of poems Assente In-Giustificato accompanied by illustrations by the artist Mara Corraine, followed in 1981 with the poetry collection Nelle aranciate amare. The following year he published his first narrative work, the short novel Consumazioni al tavolo. This was followed by the generational novel Sentiamoci qualche volta in 1984, then collected together with Consumazioni al tavolo in Partners, with the unpublished Feste perdute, in 1988. In the same year he published the collection of short stories Fuoco magico. In 1998 he collected Quando Chicco si spoglia sorride sempre, which received the Arturo Loria award; while in 2010 A cosa servono gli amori infelici was a finalist for the Strega Prize the following year Backstage from 2013 is a long letter from the writer to his publisher while his latest literary effort is the novel Dilettanti (2018).

Severini died on 16 July 2025, at the age of 84.
