= Dmitri Egorov =

Russian mathematician (1869–1931)

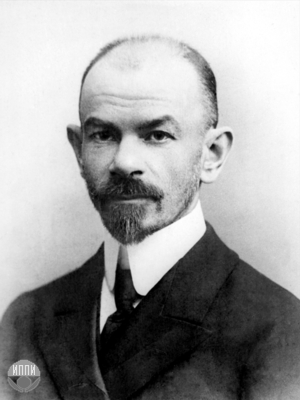
- Born: Dmitri Fyodorovich Egorov; December 22, 1869; Moscow, Russian Empire
- Died: September 10, 1931 (aged 61); Kazan, Soviet Union
- Citizenship: Russian Empire; Soviet Union
- Education: Imperial Moscow University (1891)
- Known for: Works on differential geometry and mathematical analysis, Egorov's Theorem, president of the Moscow Mathematical Society
- Scientific career
- Fields: Mathematics
- Workplaces: Imperial Moscow University; Moscow State University
- Thesis: Concerning One Class of Orthogonal Systems (1901)
- Doctoral advisor: Nikolai Bugaev
- Doctoral students: Pavel Alexandrov; Nikolai Luzin; Ivan Petrovsky; Ivan Privalov; Adolf Yushkevich; Dmitrii Menshov

Dmitri Fyodorovich Egorov (Russian: Дмитрий Фёдорович Егоров; December 22, 1869 – September 10, 1931) was a Russian and Soviet mathematician known for contributions to the areas of differential geometry and mathematical analysis. He was President of the Moscow Mathematical Society (1923–1930).

== Life ==
Egorov held spiritual beliefs to be of great importance, and openly defended the Church against Marxist supporters after the Russian Revolution. He was elected president of the Moscow Mathematical Society in 1921, and became director of the Institute for Mechanics and Mathematics at Moscow State University in 1923. He also edited the journal Matematicheskii Sbornik of the Moscow Mathematical Society. However, because of Egorov's stance against the repression of the Russian Orthodox Church, he was dismissed from the Institute in 1929 and publicly rebuked. In 1930 he was arrested and imprisoned as a "religious sectarian", and soon after was expelled from the Moscow Mathematical Society. Upon imprisonment, Egorov began a hunger strike until he was taken to the prison hospital, and eventually to the house of fellow mathematician Nikolai Chebotaryov where he died. He was buried in Arskoe Cemetery in Kazan.

== Research work ==
Egorov studied potential surfaces and triply orthogonal systems, and made contributions to the broader areas of differential geometry and integral equations. His work was influenced by that of Jean Gaston Darboux on differential geometry and by Henri Lebesgue in mathematical analysis. A theorem in real analysis and integration theory, Egorov's Theorem, is named after him.

== Works ==
- Egoroff, D. Th. (1911), "Sur les suites de fonctions mesurables", Comptes rendus hebdomadaires des séances de l'Académie des sciences (in French), 152: 244–246, JFM 42.0423.01, available at Gallica.

== Bibliography ==
- Kuznetsov, P. I. (1971), "Dmitrii Fedorovich Egorov (on the centenary of his birth)", Uspekhi Matematicheskikh Nauk (in Russian), 26 (5): 169–206, Bibcode:1971RuMaS..26..125K, doi:10.1070/RM1971v026n05ABEH003830, MR 0384434, S2CID 250827995, Zbl 0222.01015.
- Severini, C. (1910), "Sulle successioni di funzioni ortogonali (On the sequences of orthogonal functions)", Atti dell'Accademia Gioenia, serie 5^{a} (in Italian), 3 (5): Memoria XIII, 1–7, JFM 41.0475.04.
