= Iosif Goshkevich =

Russian diplomat and Orientalist

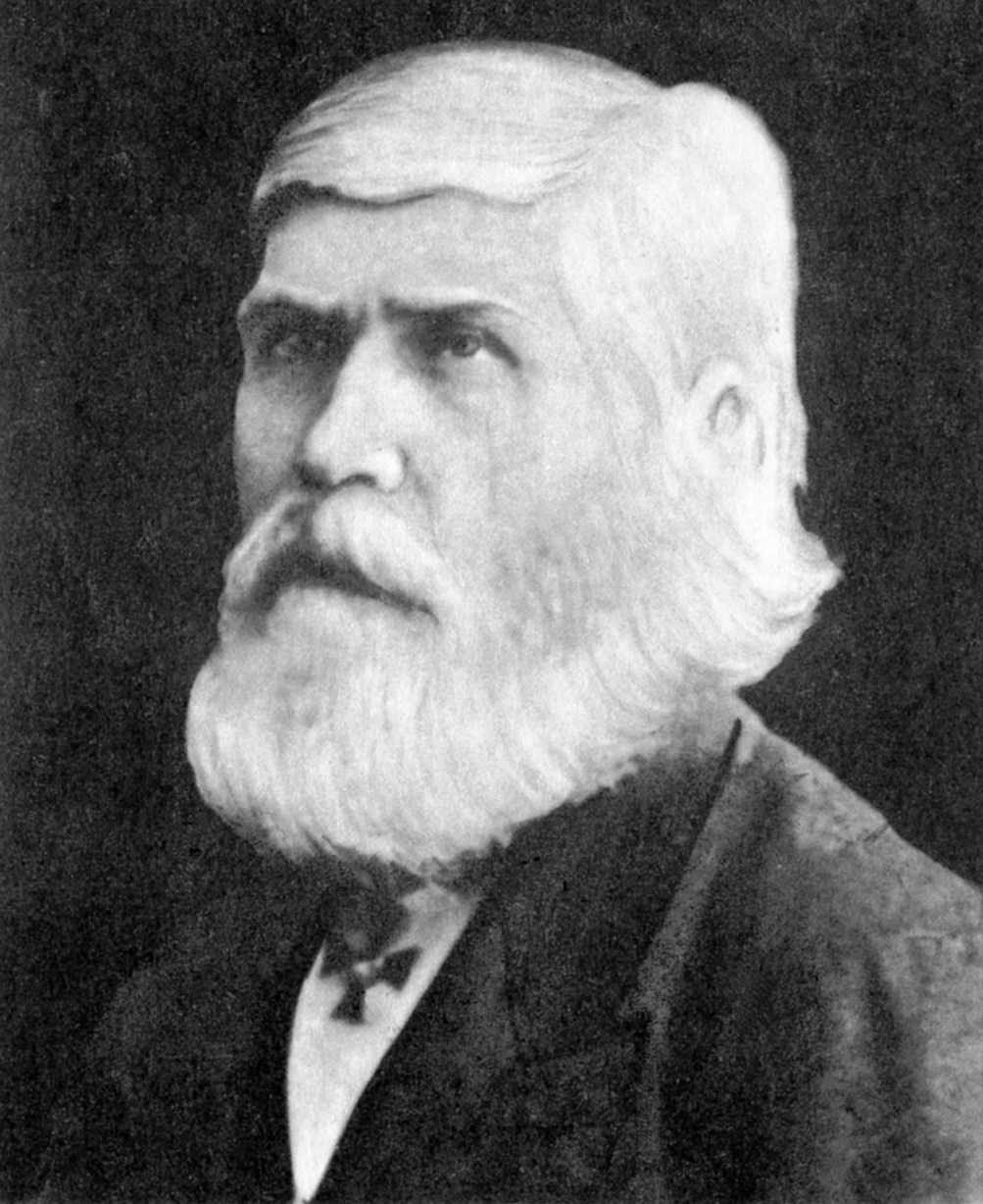
Iosif Goshkevich

Iosif Antonovich Goshkevich (Russian: Иосиф Антонович Гошкевич) (April 16, 1814, in Minsk Governorate – October 5, 1875) was a Russian diplomat and Orientalist of Belarusian descent. He graduated from the Saint Petersburg Theological Academy in 1839 and served in the Russian clerical legation in Beijing from 1839 to 1848. From 1853 to 1855, he worked as an interpreter for the Chinese language in Yefim Putyatin's embassy in Japan. Goshkevich then served in Asiatic department of Russian MFA from 1856 to 1858. Along with a Japanese co-author, Goshkevich compiled the first Japanese-Russian dictionary, which was published in Saint Petersburg in 1857. Goshkevich also became the first Russian diplomatic representative in Japan, serving from 1858 to 1865. He wrote several works about China, Japan and the peculiarities of Japanese and Chinese languages.

== Biography ==
Goshkevich, the son of a priest, attended the Minsk Theological Seminary, graduating in 1835 with the best marks, and was then sent to study at the Saint Petersburg Theological Academy. His thesis on the history of the Sacrament of Penance earned him a doctorate.

By decision of the Most Holy Synod, Goshkevich became a member of the 12th Russian Ecclesiastical Mission in Beijing in 1839. There he worked as a naturalist. His insect and butterfly collection later completed the collections of the Academy of Sciences. He described the production of ink as well as Chinese customs and traditions, and he compiled a Russian-Manchurian dictionary. For his fundamental reports, he received the Order of Saint Stanislaus 3rd Class.

After returning to St. Petersburg in 1848, Goshkevich became an official for special tasks in the Asia Department of the Foreign Ministry in 1850. In 1852 he took part in Yevfimiy Putyatin's mission to Japan as interpreter and adviser on the frigate Pallada. On January 26, he participated in the signing of the Treaty of Shimoda. In July 1855 he left Japan on the brig Greta, on which he became a British prisoner in Hong Kong due to the still ongoing Crimean War. In captivity, with the help of the Japanese Tazibana-no Koossai (1820-1885, after baptism Vladimir Iossifovich Yamatov), he compiled the first Japanese-Russian dictionary. When Goshkevich returned to St. Petersburg after the end of the Crimean War in 1856, he was awarded the Medal of Remembrance of the War of 1853–1856. In 1857 he was awarded the Order of Saint Anna 2nd Class with Crown with an additional 500 rubles in silver. His Japanese-Russian dictionary was printed, and he was appointed Imperial Russian Consul in Japan. In 1858 he received the undivided Demidov Prize.

In November 1858, Goshkevich arrived in Hakodate on the sailing screw clipper Dzhigit. He immediately traveled to Edo for the ratification of the Russo-Japanese Trade and Navigation Treaty. His wife Yelizaveta Stepanovna died in 1864 at the age of 43 and was buried in the Russian cemetery in Hakodate.

In 1865 he returned to St. Petersburg and served in the Asia Department of the Ministry of Foreign Affairs with the rank of Collegiate Councillor (6th rank class). In 1866 he retired from the service and settled on his estate Mali. He had a rich library and a collection of valuable maps. He wrote a book on the roots of the Japanese language, which was not published until after his death in 1899. In 1871 he and his second wife were admitted to the hereditary nobility. In 1872 their son Iossif was born.
