= Nikolay Zhukovsky (scientist) =

Russian scientist (1847–1921)

- Николай Жуковский
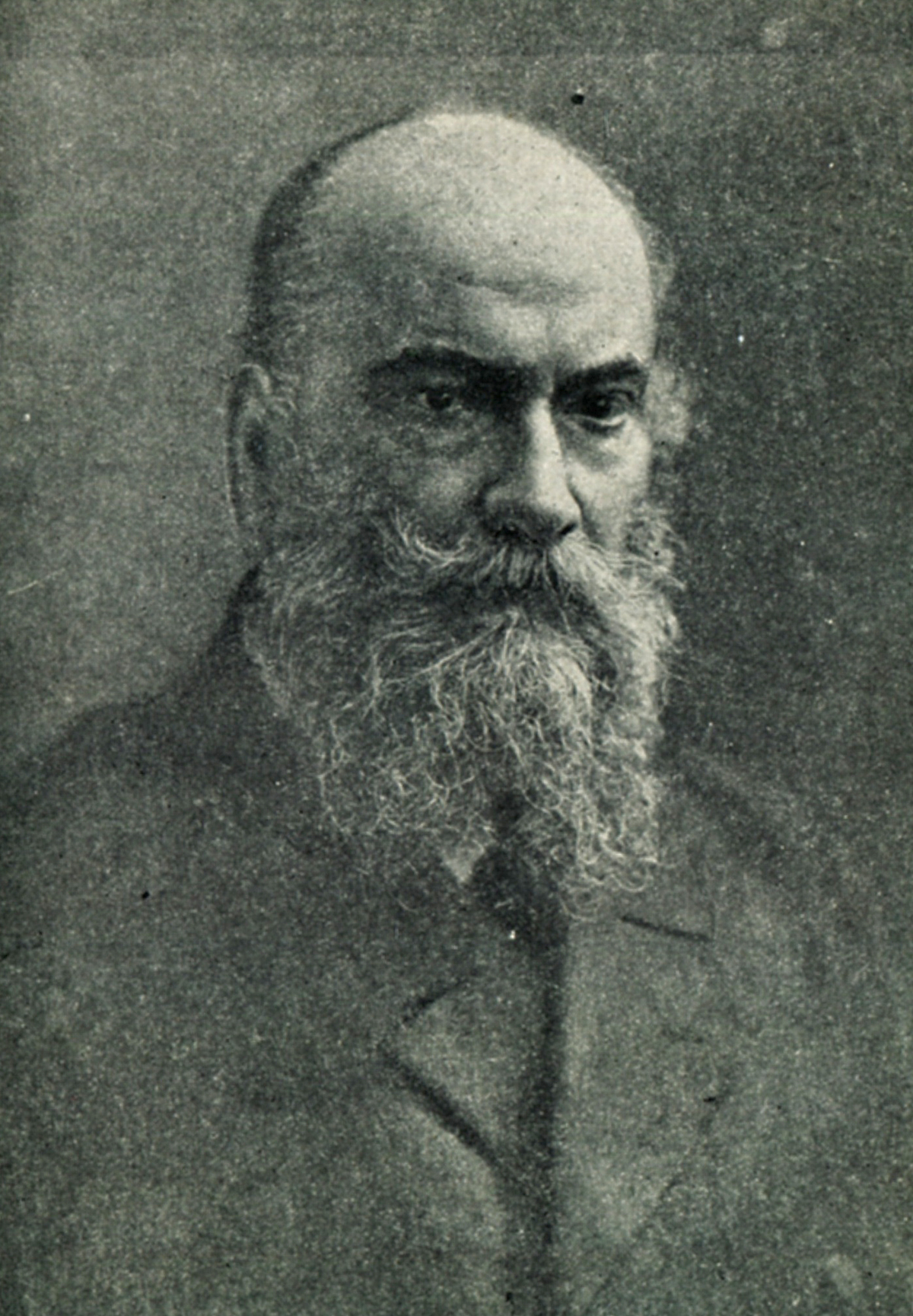
- Born: 17 January 1847; Orekhovo, Vladimir Governorate, Russian Empire
- Died: 17 March 1921 (aged 74); Moscow, Russian SFSR
- Education: Moscow State University
- Known for: Joukowsky equation Joukowsky transform Kutta–Joukowski theorem
- Awards: Order of Saint Anna; Order of Saint Stanislaus; Order of Saint Vladimir
- Scientific career
- Fields: Aerodynamics
- Workplaces: Imperial Moscow University; Bauman Moscow State Technical University; Moscow State University
- Academic advisors: August Davidov
- Notable students: S. Chaplygin; L. I. Sedov; V. V. Shuleikin; Leonid Leibenson; Andrei Tupolev

Signature
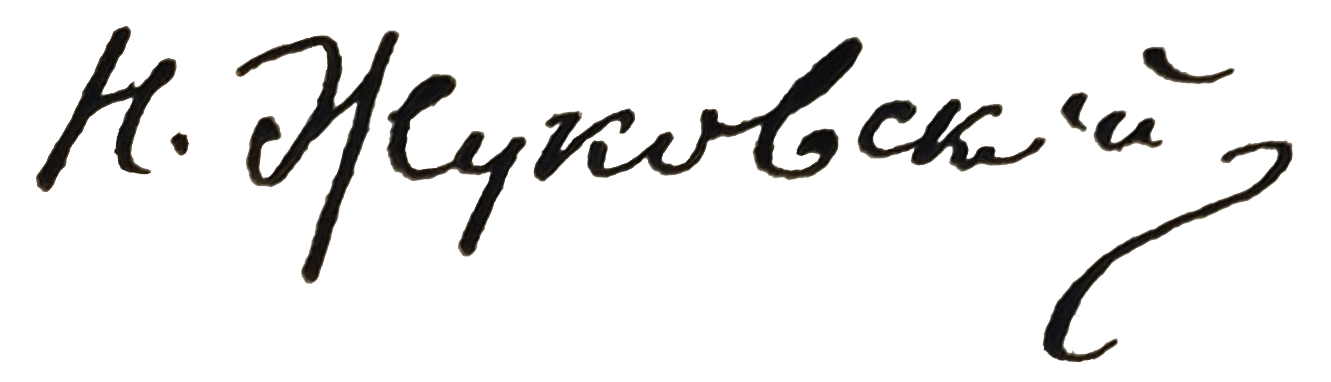

Nikolay Yegorovich Zhukovsky (Russian: Никола́й Его́рович Жуко́вский, IPA: [ʐʊˈkofskʲɪj]; 17 January [O.S. 5 January] 1847 – 17 March 1921) was a Russian scientist, mathematician and engineer, and a founding father of modern aero- and hydrodynamics. Whereas contemporary scientists scoffed at the idea of human flight, Zhukovsky was the first to undertake the study of airflow. He is often called the Father of Russian Aviation.

The Joukowsky transform is named after him, while the fundamental aerodynamical theorem, the Kutta–Joukowski theorem, is named after both him and German mathematician Martin Kutta.

== Life ==
Zhukovsky was born in the village of Orekhovo, Vladimir Governorate, Russian Empire. In 1868 he graduated from Moscow University where he studied under August Davidov. From 1872 he was a professor at the Imperial Technical School. In 1904, he established the world's first Aerodynamic Institute in Kachino near Moscow. He was influenced by both Ernst Mach and his son Ludwig Mach. From 1918 he was the head of TsAGI (Central AeroHydroDynamics Institute).

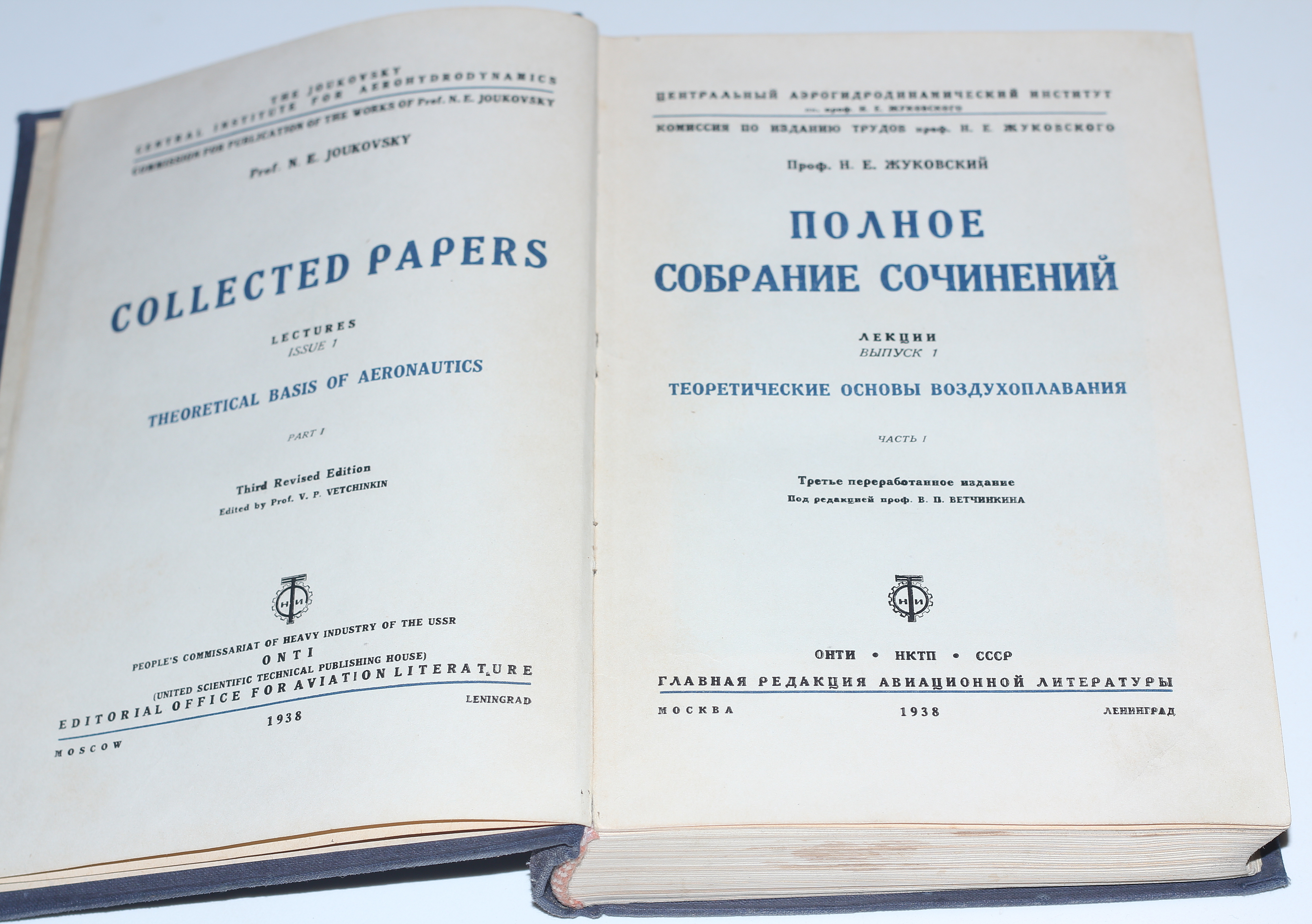
Collected paper Nikolay Zhukovsky. Theoretical basis aeronautics.

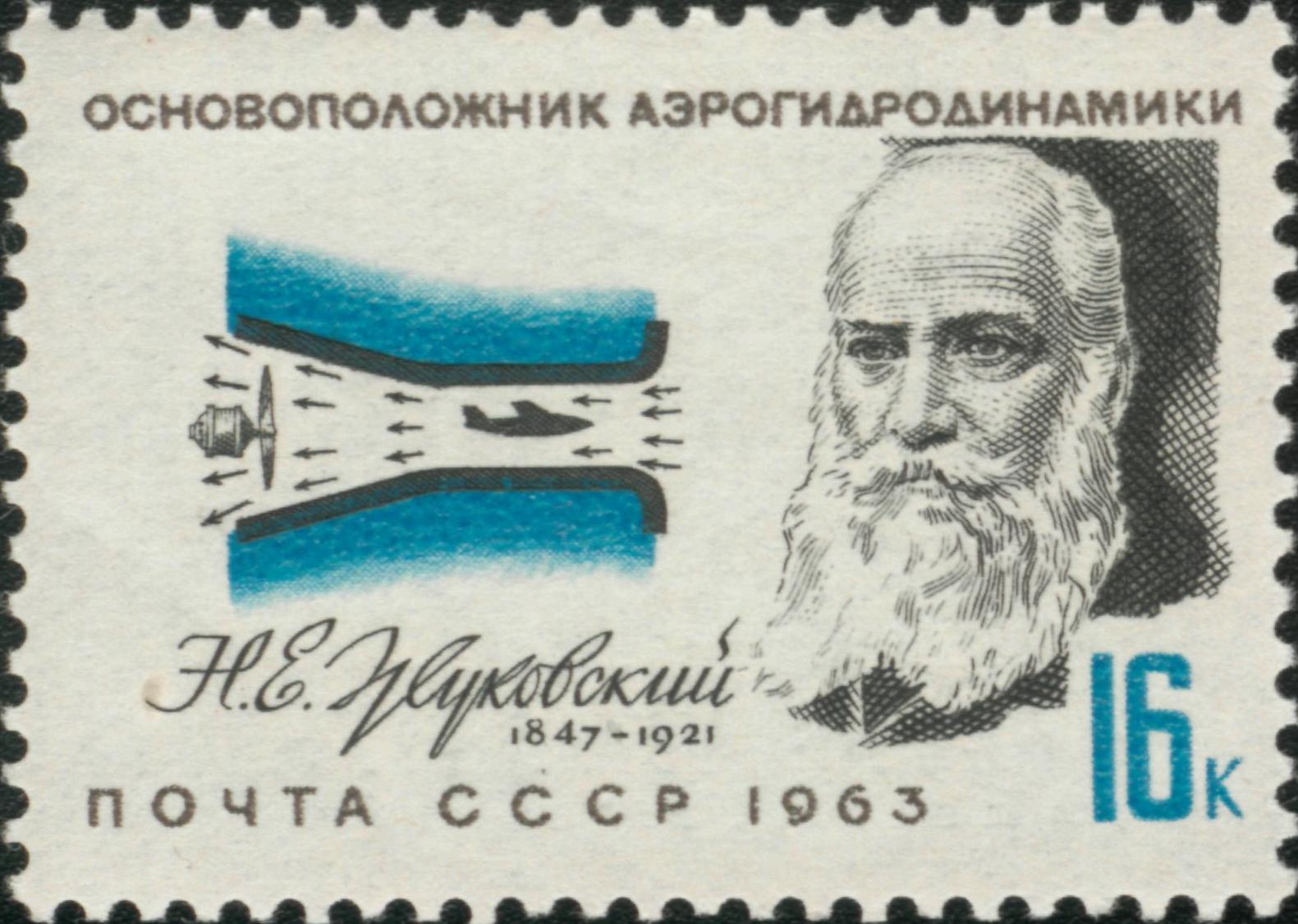
Stamp from the USSR Aviation series 1963 dedicated to Zhukovsky (CFA 2915, Scott 2774)

Zhukovsky was the first scientist to explain mathematically the origin of aerodynamic lift, through his circulation hypothesis, the first to establish that the lift force generated by a body moving through an ideal fluid is proportional to the velocity and the circulation around the body. He is credited with the Joukowsky airfoil - an ideal shape of the aerodynamic profile having as essential elements a rounded nose (leading edge), double surface (finite thickness), cambered or symmetrical, and a sharp trailing edge. He built the first wind tunnel in Russia. He was also responsible for the eponymous water hammer equation used by civil engineers.

He published a derivation for the maximum energy obtainable from a turbine in 1920, at the same time as German scientist Albert Betz. This is known controversially as Betz's law, as this result was also derived by British scientist Frederick W. Lanchester. This is a famous example of Stigler's law of eponymy.

In December 1918 at Zhukovsky's proposal and with his active participation, the Soviet government founded the Central Aerohydrodynamic Institute (TsAGI), of which he became the first head. At the same time, theoretical courses for military pilots were founded, later transformed into the Moscow Aviation Technical College. The Institute of Engineers of the Red Air Fleet was established on its base in 1920, and in May 1922 it became the Air Force Engineering Academy named after Zhukovsky.

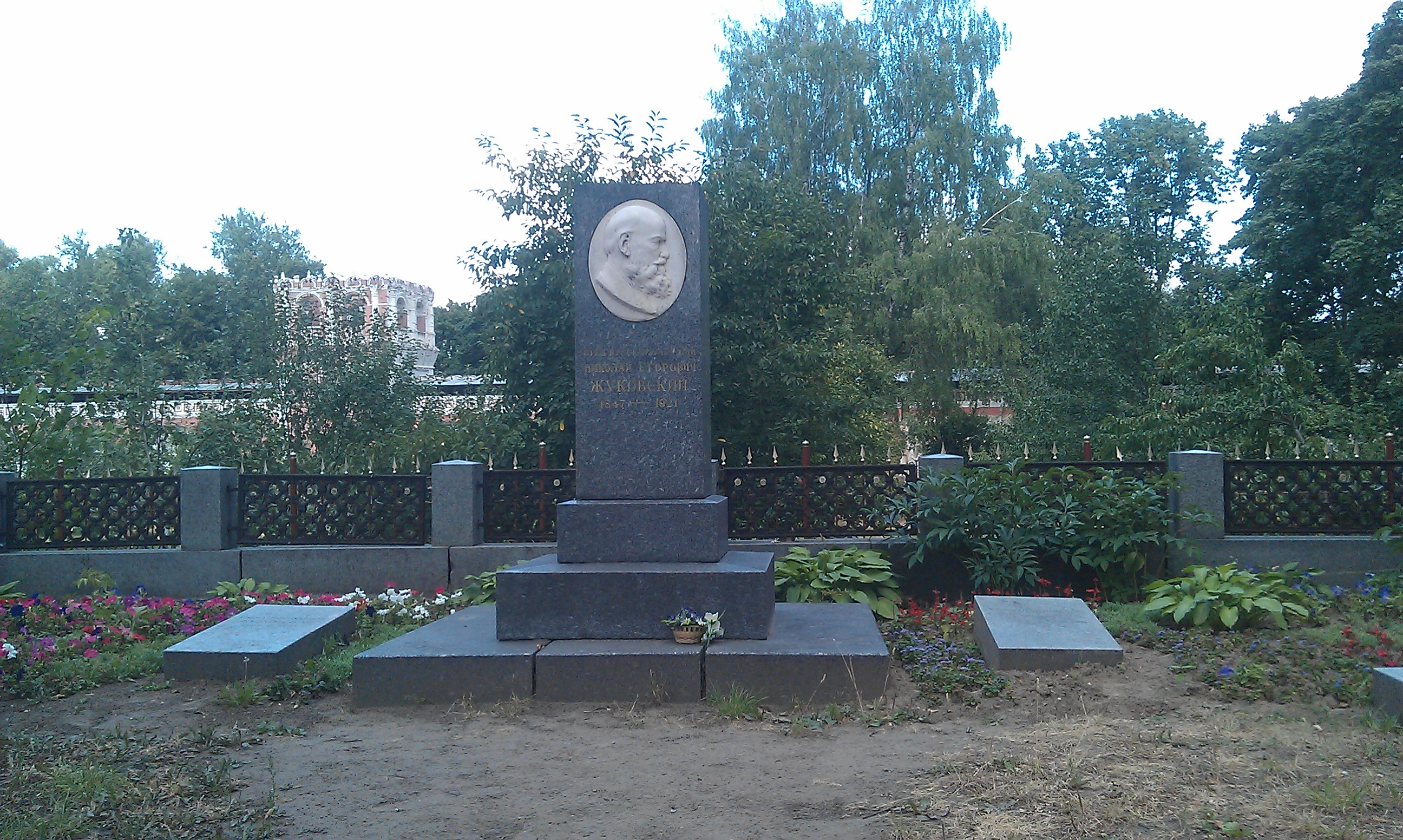
The graves of Nikolai Egorovich, Elena and Sergei Zhukovsky

Zhukovsky died in Moscow in 1921.

== Recognition ==
A city near Moscow and the crater Zhukovskiy on the Moon are both named in his honor.

The State Zhukovsky Prize was established in 1920 'for the best works in mathematics'.

The Russian Air Force's engineering academy was named for him, later reorganized into the Zhukovsky – Gagarin Air Force Academy. In May 2016 Moscow's fourth largest airport was named in his honor.

Mosfilm produced a 1950 eponymous biopic directed by Vsevolod Pudovkin with music by Vissarion Shebalin, which earned Pudovkin and Shebalin the USSR State Prize in 1951.

The Russian Central Aero-Hydrodynamic Institute and the Ukrainian National Aerospace University – Kharkiv Aviation Institute are named after him.

The Zhukovsky House is a museum dedicated to his memory

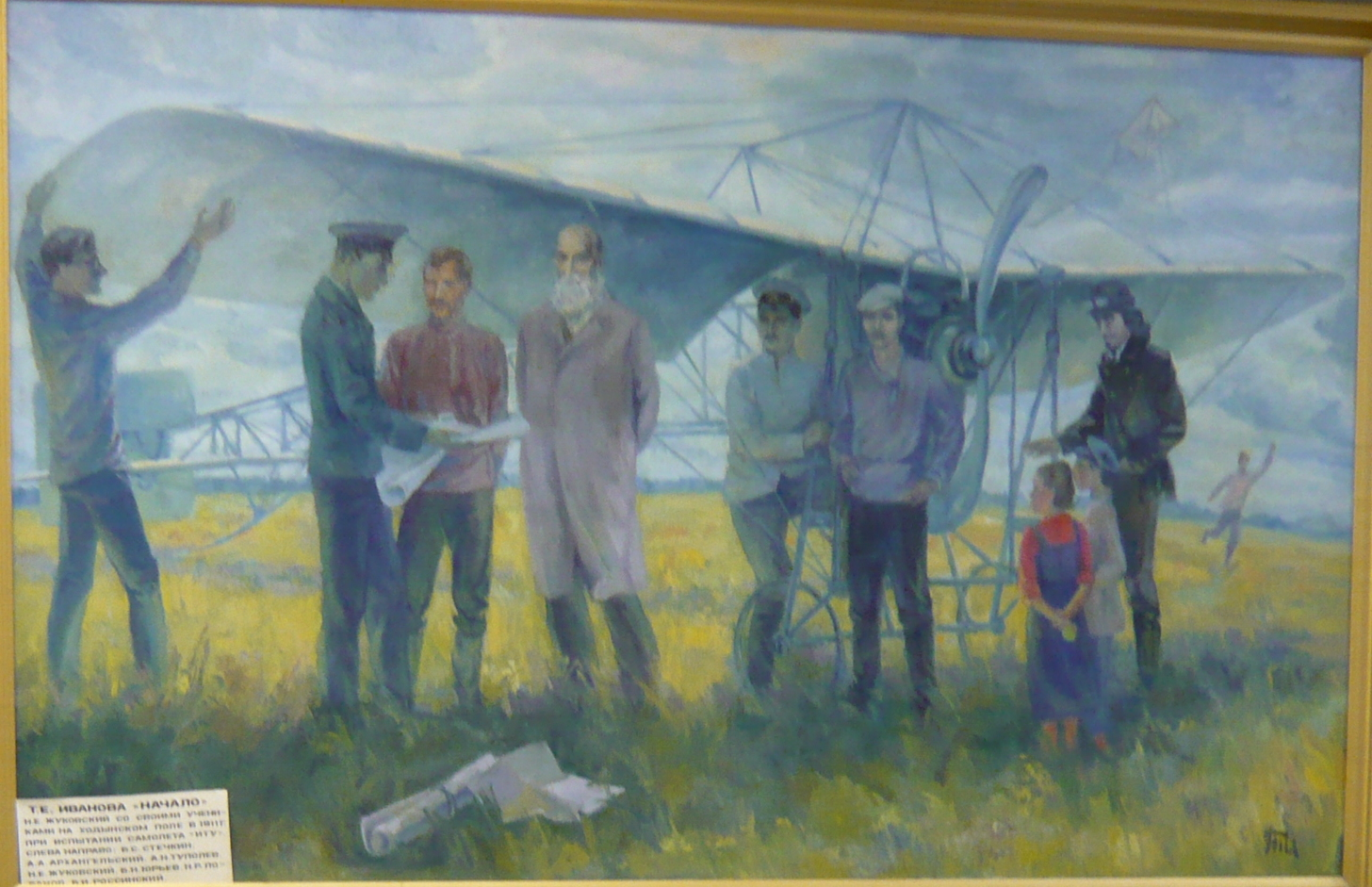

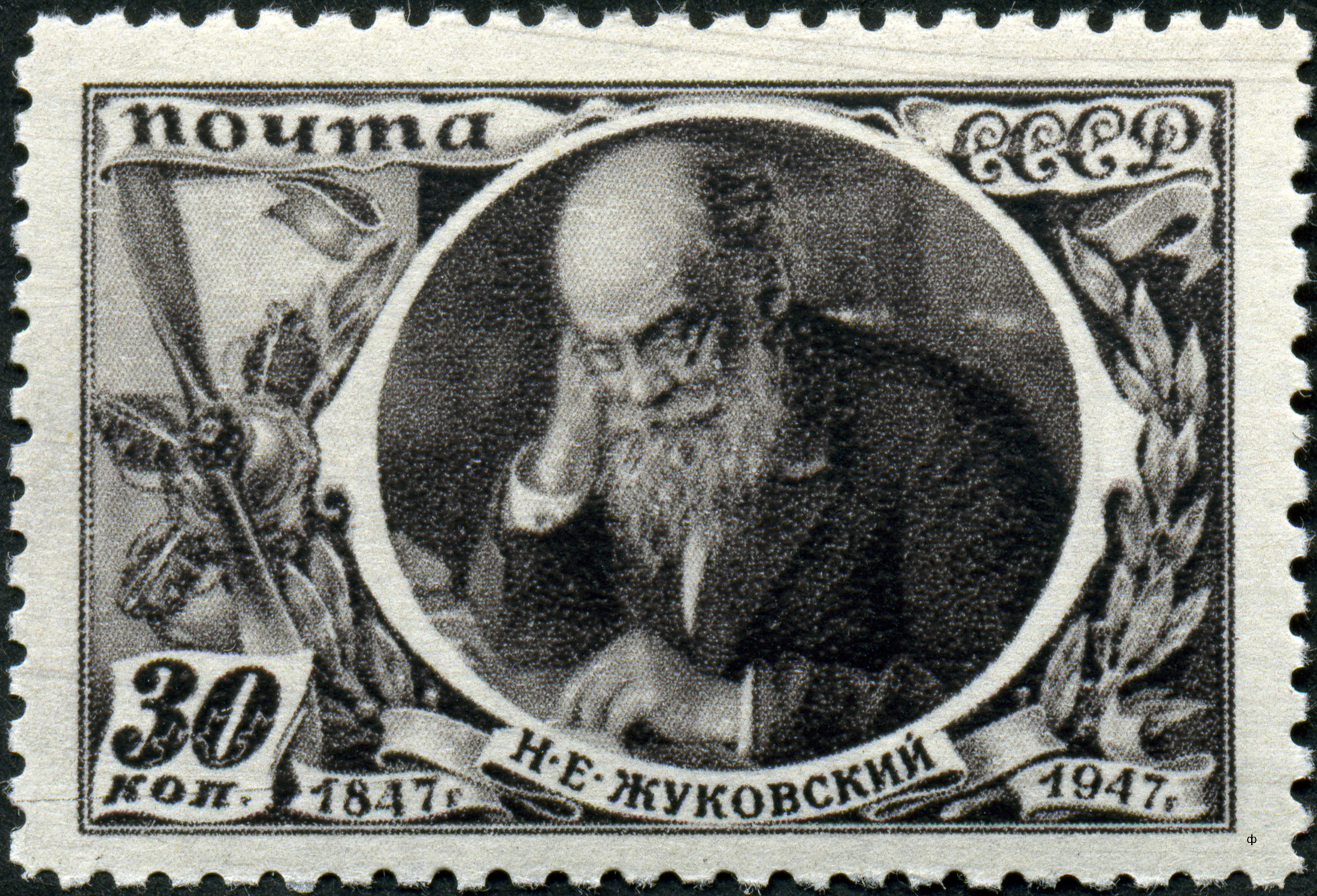
1947 stamp

== See also ==
- Joukowsky equation
- Joukowsky transform
- Kutta–Joukowski theorem
