= Ivan Privalov =

Russian mathematician (1891–1941)

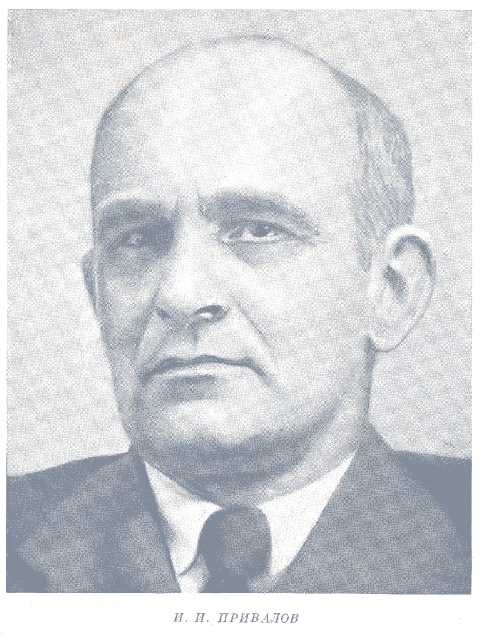
- Born: 11 February 1891; Nizhny Lomov, Russian Empire
- Died: 13 July 1941 (aged 50); Moscow, Soviet Union
- Education: Moscow State University
- Known for: Works on analytical functions, Luzin-Privalov theorems.
- Scientific career
- Fields: Mathematics
- Workplaces: Imperial Saratov University (1917–1922); Moscow State University (1922–1941)
- Doctoral advisor: Dmitri Egorov; Nikolai Luzin

Ivan Ivanovich Privalov (Russian: Ива́н Ива́нович Привáлов; 11 February 1891 – 13 July 1941) was a Soviet and Russian mathematician best known for his work on analytic functions.

== Biography ==
Privalov graduated from Moscow State University (MSU) in 1913 studying under Dmitri Egorov and Nikolai Luzin. He obtained his master's degree from MSU in 1916 and became professor at Imperial Saratov University (1917—1922). In 1922, he was appointed professor at MSU and worked there for the rest of his life.

He was elected a corresponding member of the Academy of Sciences of the Soviet Union in 1939. He was also a member of the French Mathematical Society (Société mathématique de France) and the Mathematical Circle of Palermo (Circolo Matematico di Palermo).

== Research work ==
Privalov wrote Cauchy Integral (1918) which built on work by Fatou. He also worked on many problems jointly with Luzin. In 1934, he studied subharmonic functions, building on the work of Riesz.

== PhD students ==
- Samary Aleksandrovich Galpern.

== Publications ==
=== Books ===
- I. I. Privalov, Subharmonic Functions, GITTL, Moscow, 1937.
- I. I. Privalov, Introduction to the Theory of Functions of a Complex Variable, GITTL, Moscow-Leningrad, 1948 (14n ed: 1999, ISBN 5-06-003612-X).
- I. I. Privalov, Boundary Properties of Analytic Functions, 2nd ed., GITTL, Moscow-Leningrad, 1950.

== See also ==
- Luzin–Privalov theorems
