= Nikolai Bugaev =

Russian mathematician (1837–1903)

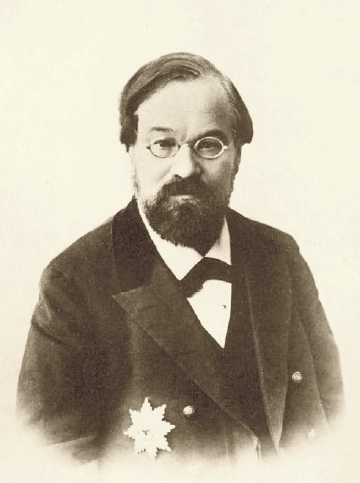
- Born: Nikolai Vasilievich Bugaev; September 14, 1837; Dusheti, Tiflis Governorate, Russian Empire
- Died: June 11, 1903 (aged 65); Moscow, Russian Empire
- Education: Imperial Moscow University
- Spouse: Aleksandra Dmitrievna Egorova (m. 1880; died 1922)
- Children: Andrei Bely
- Scientific career
- Fields: Mathematics
- Workplaces: Imperial Moscow University
- Academic advisors: Karl Weierstrass; Ernst Kummer; Joseph Liouville
- Doctoral students: Dmitri Egorov; Nikolay Sonin
- Other notable students: Pavel Florensky

Nikolai Vasilievich Bugaev (Russian: Николай Васильевич Бугаев; September 14, 1837 – June 11, 1903) was a Russian mathematician, the father of Andrei Bely.

== Early life and education ==
Bugaev was born in Dusheti, Tiflis Governorate, Russian Empire (now in Georgia) into a somewhat unstable family (his father was an army doctor), and at the age of ten young Nikolai was sent to Moscow to find his own means of obtaining an education. He graduated in 1859 from Moscow University, where he majored in mathematics and physics.

Bugaev then studied engineering and then wrote a master's thesis in 1863 on the convergence of infinite series. This document was considered sufficiently impressive to win him a place studying under Karl Weierstrass and Ernst Kummer in Berlin. He also spent some time in Paris studying under Joseph Liouville. He earned his doctoral degree in 1866.

== Career ==
After his doctoral degree, Bugaev returned to Moscow and taught there for the remainder of his career. Some of his most influential papers offered proofs of previously unproven assertions of Liouville, but his most original work centered around the development of formal analogies between arithmetic and analytic operations.

Bugaev was an active member and president (1891-1903) of the Moscow Mathematical Society. He also wrote influential philosophical essays in which he trumpeted the virtues of mathematical analysis and decried the influence of geometry and probability. Many feel he is largely responsible for the pronounced predilection towards "hard analysis" which is characteristic of so much of the best Russian mathematics. Through Bugaev's star student, Dmitri Egorov, many well-known Russian mathematicians, such as Andrei Kolmogorov and Nikolai Luzin, directly "descend" from Bugaev—and thus from the Prince of Mathematicians, Carl Friedrich Gauss.

== Personal life ==
Bugaev was a talented chess player. He defeated William Steinitz in 1896 in a Simul.

Bugaev was a memorable "character" whose life was touched by scandal. He was not, it is said, much admired for his looks, but his wife was considered brilliant, beautiful, and rich, and the Bugaevs were socially prominent. Their mathematically, musically, and artistically talented son, Boris Nikolaevich Bugaev (14 October 1880 O.S.-8 January 1934), went on to adopt the pseudonym Andrei Bely, under which name he helped found the Symbolist movement. Professor Korobkin, the main character of Bely's innovative novel Moscow, was inspired by Nikolai Bugaev. In view of his father's prejudices, Boris Bugaev was fascinated by probability and particularly by the notion of entropy, which is mentioned in several of his novels and poems.

== Sources ==
- A. Andreev, D. Tsygankov, ed. (2010). Imperial Moscow University: 1755-1917: encyclopedic dictionary. Moscow: Russian political encyclopedia (ROSSPEN). pp. 99–100. ISBN 978-5-8243-1429-8.
