= Matematicheskii Sbornik =

- Discipline: Mathematics
- Language: Russian
- Edited by: Boris Kashin

Publication details
- History: 1866–present
- Publisher: Moscow Mathematical Society
- Impact factor: 0.845 (2020)

Standard abbreviations
- ISO 4: Mat. Sb.

Indexing
- ISSN: 0368-8666

Matematicheskii Sbornik (Russian: Математический сборник, abbreviated Mat. Sb.) is a peer reviewed Russian mathematical journal founded by the Moscow Mathematical Society in 1866. It is the oldest successful Russian mathematical journal. The English translation is Sbornik: Mathematics. It is also sometimes cited under the alternative name Izdavaemyi Moskovskim Matematicheskim Obshchestvom or its French translation Recueil mathématique de la Société mathématique de Moscou, but the name Recueil mathématique is also used for an unrelated journal, Mathesis. Yet another name, Sovetskii Matematiceskii Sbornik, was listed in a statement in the journal in 1931 apologizing for the former editorship of Dmitri Egorov, who had been recently discredited for his religious views; however, this name was never actually used by the journal.

The first editor of the journal was Nikolai Brashman, who died before its first issue (dedicated to his memory) was published. Its current editor-in-chief is Boris Kashin.

The journal is indexed in Russian Science Citation Index.

== Selected articles ==
Notable articles published in Matematicheskii Sbornik have included:

- Соболев, С. (1938), Об одной теореме функционального анализа [On a theorem of functional analysis], Mat. Sb. (in Russian), 4: 471–497. Translated in Transl. Amer. Math. Soc. 34 (2): 39–68, 1963. This paper by Sergei Sobolev introduced Sobolev spaces and Sobolev inequalities. In 2009, Laurent Saloff-Coste wrote that "there are few articles that have turned out to be as influential and important."

== English translation ==
From 1967 to 1993 (volumes 1–74) the English version was titled Mathematics of the USSR. Sbornik (ISSN 0025-5734).

Since 1993 (volumes 75–) it has been titled Sbornik. Mathematics and abbreviated Sb. Math. (ISSN 1064-5616).

From 1995 the translation has been published jointly by the London Mathematical Society, Turpion Ltd, and the Russian Academy of Sciences. The volume numbering was also changed and now follows the Russian original journal Matematicheskii Sbornik.

== Impact ==
As of 2018, the impact factor of Sb. Math. in Journal Citation Reports is 1.057. Alternatively, mathnet.ru calculates its impact factor for 2018 as 1.089.
