= Alexey Olovnikov =

Russian biologist (1936–2022)

- Born: Alexey Matveyevich Olovnikov; 10 October 1936
- Died: 6 December 2022 (aged 86)
- Occupation: Biologist

Alexey Matveyevich Olovnikov (Russian: Алексей Матвеевич Оловников; 10 October 1936 – 6 December 2022) was a Russian biologist. Among other things, in 1971, he was the first to recognize the problem of telomere shortening, to predict the existence of telomerase, and to suggest the telomere hypothesis of aging and the relationship of telomeres to cancer.

Olovnikov's theories were initially met with skepticism, but gained recognition in the late 20th century after the discovery of telomerase by Elizabeth Blackburn, Carol Greider, and Jack Szostak, who won the 2009 Nobel Prize in Physiology or Medicine for their work

Despite this discovery, he was not awarded a share of the 2009 Nobel Prize in Physiology or Medicine, awarded for the discovery of the enzyme and its biological significance. In 2009 he was awarded Demidov Prize of the Russian Academy of Sciences.

Alexey Olovnikov realized that explaining aging solely at the organismal level was inadequate, seeing telomere shortening as a "marker" rather than the root cause of aging.

Olovnikov predicted the presence of a specialized DNA polymerase that lengthens telomeres in stem cells.

== Personal life ==
Alexey Olovnikov was married to Natalia Olovnikova until his death in 2022.

== Death ==
Dr. Olovnikov died December 6, 2022 at the age of 86. No specific reason has been publicly provided for his death.
