= Konstantin Nevolin =

Russian legal historian (1806–1855)

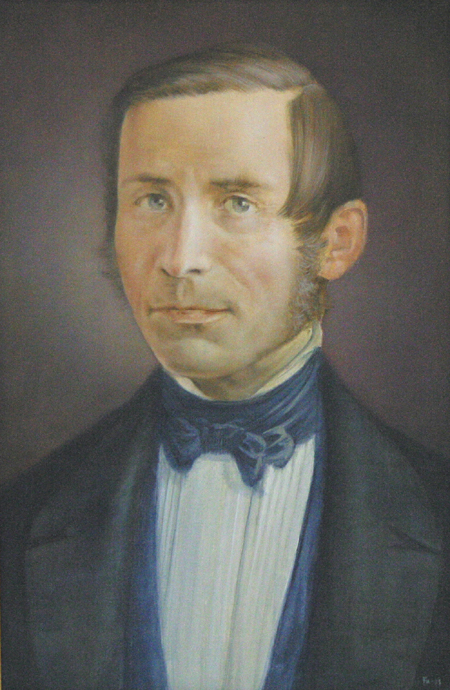
- Konstantin Alekseevich Nevolin
- Born: 1806; Orlov, Vyatka Governorate
- Died: Oct. 6 (18), 1855; Brixen im Thale

Konstantin Alekseevich Nevolin (1806–1855) was a Russian legal historian.

== Academic career ==
He started his academic career as a professor of law in Berlin in 1829. In 1834 he returned to Kiev after he was appointed rector of the newly founded University of Kiev. Later he also served as a professor of law at Saint Petersburg State University from 1843.

== Monographs ==
Nevolin compiled his two-volume Encyclopedia of Jurisprudence (vols. 1–2, 1839–1840), on the history of government. It was heavily influenced by Hegel's Philosophy of Right. His other monographs include History of Russian Civil Laws (vols. 1–3, 1851), The Formation of Governmental Administration in Russia From Ivan III up to Peter the Great (1844), On the Novgorod Piatiny and Pogosty in the XVI Century (1853) and A General List of Russian Cities (1844).

Educational offices
Preceded by Volodymyr Tsykh	Rector of St.Vladimir Kiev University; 1837–1843	Succeeded by Vasiliy Fyodorov
