= Gladkov =

Gladkov (masculine, Russian: Гладков) or Gladkova (feminine, Russian: Гладкова) is a Russian surname. Notable people with the surname include:

- Aleksandr Gladkov (general) (1902–1969), Soviet general and Hero of the Soviet Union
- Fyodor Gladkov (1883–1958), Soviet–Russian socialist writer
- Gennady Gladkov (1935–2023), Soviet–Russian composer
- Nikolai Alekseievich Gladkov, (1905–1975) Soviet ornithologist
- Yury Gladkov (1949–2007), Soviet politician
- Vyacheslav Gladkov (born 1969), Russian politician
