= Pisarzhevsky =

Pisarzhevsky is a surname. Notable people with the surname include:

- Lev Pisarzhevsky (1874–1938), Ukrainian Soviet chemist
- Viktor Pisarzhevsky (1876–1903), Russian lichenologist
