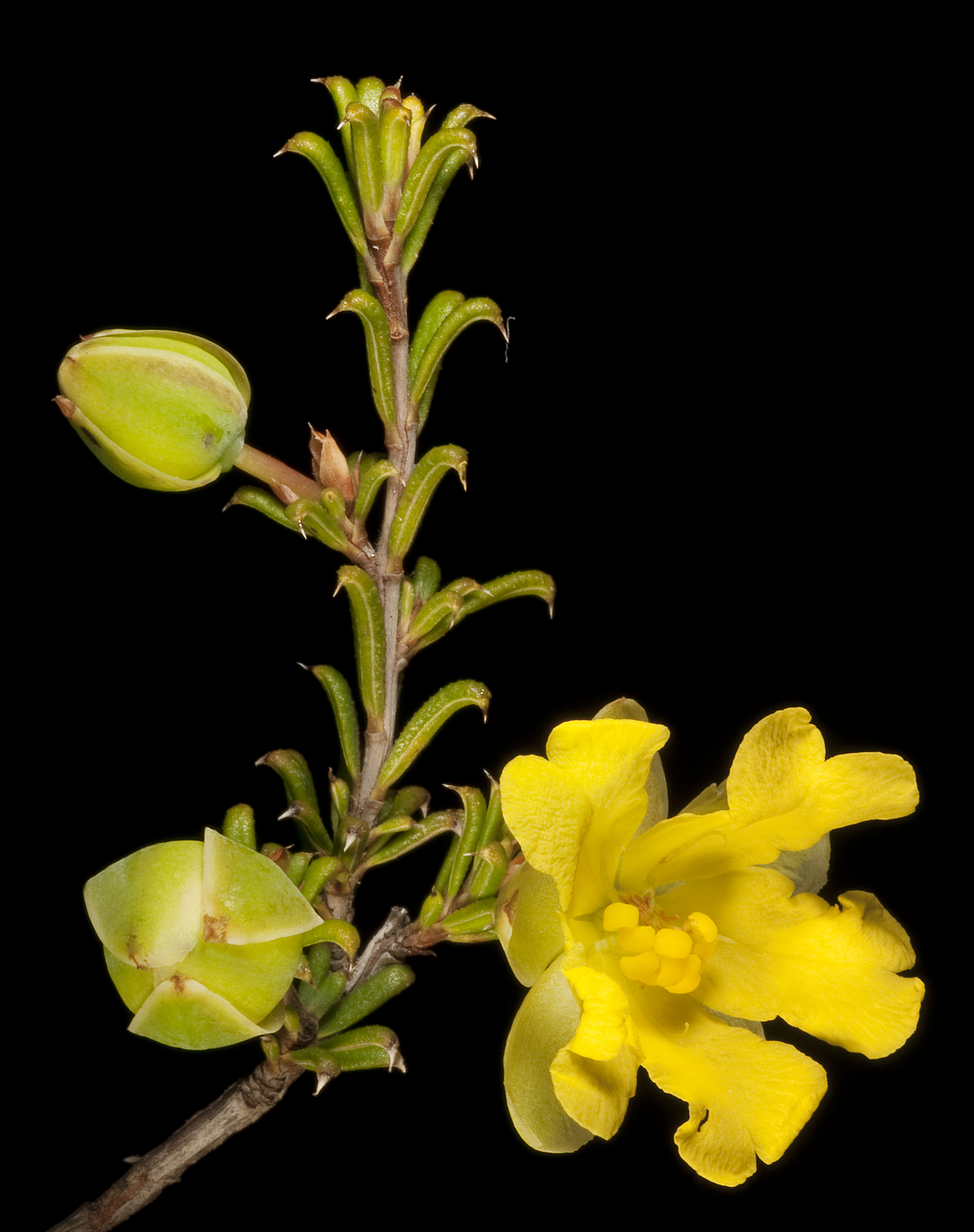

Scientific classification
- Kingdom: Plantae
- Clade: Tracheophytes
- Clade: Angiosperms
- Clade: Eudicots
- Order: Dilleniales
- Family: Dilleniaceae
- Genus: Hibbertia
- Species: H. rostellata

Binomial name
- Hibbertia rostellata Turcz.

= Hibbertia rostellata =

Species of flowering plant

Hibbertia rostellata is a species of flowering plant in the family Dilleniaceae and is endemic to the south-west of Western Australia. It is a low, straggling or erect shrub that typically grows to a height of 15–50 cm (5.9–19.7 in) and flowers between August and November producing yellow flowers. It was first formally described in 1849 by Nikolai Turczaninow in the Bulletin de la Société Impériale des Naturalistes de Moscou. The specific epithet (rostellata) means "possessing a small beak or snout", referring to the tip of leaves.

This species grows on flats and slopes in the Avon Wheatbelt, Coolgardie, Esperance Plains, Geraldton Sandplains and Mallee biogeographic regions of south-western Western Australia.

== See also ==
- List of Hibbertia species
