= Gregory Shchurovsky =

Russian geologist

Gregory Ephimovich Shchurovsky
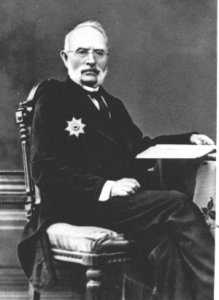
- Born: 30 January 1803; Moscow
- Died: March 20, 1884 (aged 81)

Gregory Ephimovich Shchurovsky (Russian: Григо́рий Ефи́мович Щуро́вский, Grigoriy Efimovich Shchurovskiy; 30 January 1803 – March 20, 1884) was a 19th-century Russian geologist.

== Life ==
Shchurovsky was born in Moscow, Russia, in 1803. After his father was killed in 1812, his mother Maria Gerassimovna could not afford to keep him and he was placed in an orphanage. He took his surname to honor a benefactor. He attended university in Moscow where he studied geology.

In 1863 he led the Society of Devotees of Natural Science, Anthropology, and Ethnography. Together with other leading members of the society, he advocated the establishment of a museum in Moscow. They began with the establishment of a library and, in 1871, the Moscow city council set aside half a million rubles for the museum project. The Grand Duke Konstantin Nikolayevich Romanov chaired the committee that established the Polytechnic Museum, opening with an exhibition celebrating the 200th anniversary of Peter the Great.

Shchurovsky travelled extensively throughout the Russian Empire, writing about its geology and inhabitants.

He died in 1884. He was replaced as head of the Society of Devotees by August Yulevich Davidov.

== Legacy ==
In 1871, Alexei Fedchenko named Mount Shchurovsky (Пик Щуровского, Pik Shchurovskogo) and its Shchurovsky Glacier (Ледник Щуровского, Lednik Shchurovskogo) at 39°36′N 70°36′E on what is now the Kyrgyzstan–Tajikistan border in honor of G. E. Shchurovsky. (Note: The Mount Shchurovsky on the Russia–Georgia border near Mount Elbrus in the Caucasus Mountains was named in 1915 by the Russian climbers S. Golubev, P. Panyutin, and Ya. Frolov in honor of the Russian Mining Society member Vladimir A. Shchurovsky.) The ridge it belongs to is now more generally reckoned as belonging to Mushketov Peak (Мушкетова), elevation 5,178 meters (16,988 ft).

In 1882, the botanists Eduard August von Regel and Johannes Theodor Schmalhausen published Schtschurowskia, naming a genus of Central Asian flowering plants in the family Apiaceae in honor of G. E. Shchurovsky.

The following fossilized organisms were also named in his honor:

- Parallelodon schourovskii Rouillier & Vosinsky, 1847 - species of bivalve molluscs, Upper Jurassic of the European part of Russia.
- Laugeites stchurovskii Nikitin, 1881 - a cephalopod species, Upper Jurassic of the European part of Russia.
- Stschurovskya Dovaisky, 1941 - genus of cephalopods, Upper Jurassic of the southeast of the European part of Russia.
