= Anatoli Bogdanov =

Anatoli Bogdanov may refer to:

- Anatoly Bogdanov (footballer) (born 1981), Russian footballer
- Anatoli Bogdanov (ice hockey), Soviet ice hockey coach
- Anatoli Bogdanov (sport shooter) (1931–2001), Soviet Olympic champion in shooting
- Anatoli Bogdanov (zoologist) (1834–1896), Russian zoologist and anthropologist
