= Rayevsky Manor House =

- Усадьба Раевского
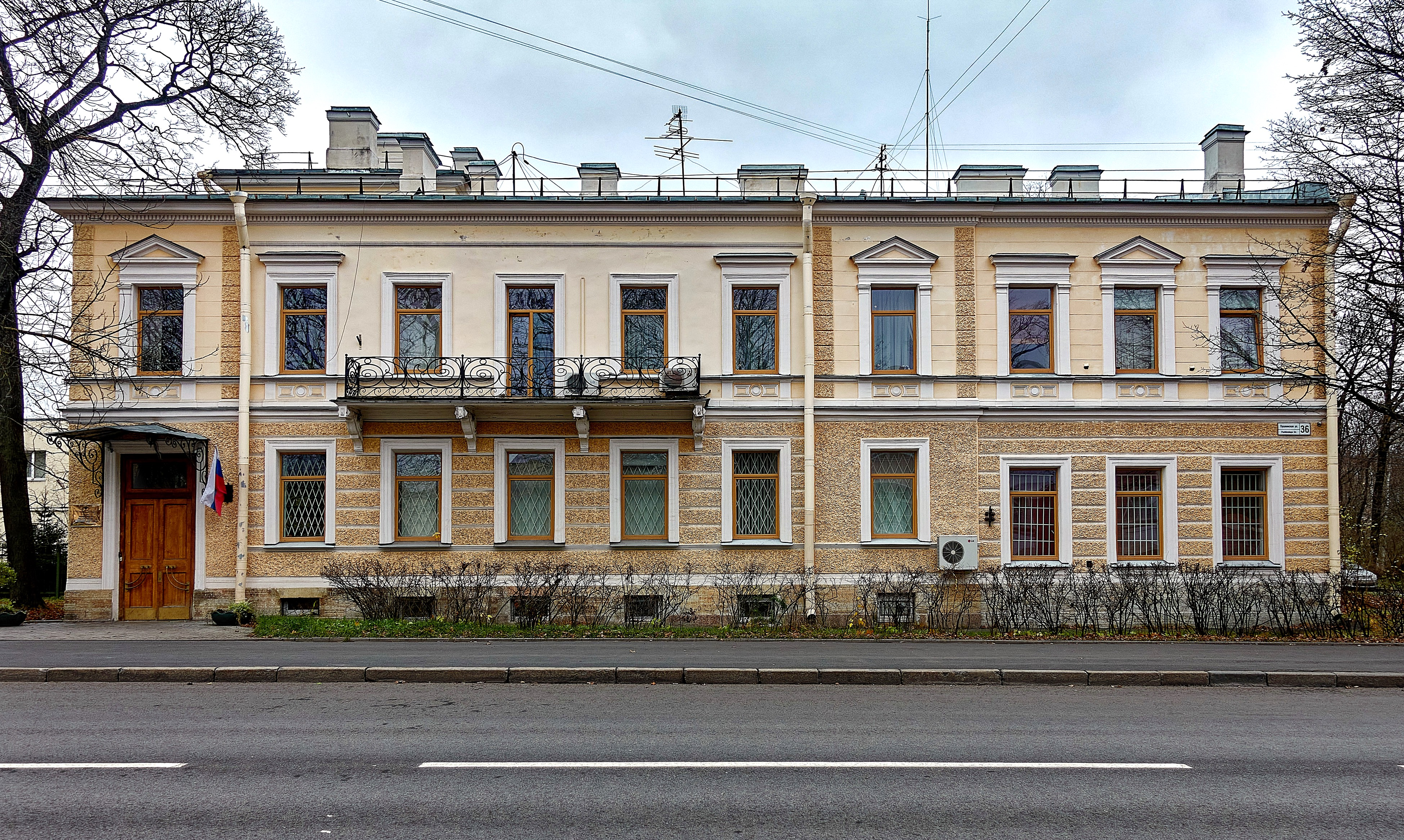
- Interactive map of the Rayevsky Manor House area

General information
- Location: Pushkin, 34, 36 Pushkinskaya Street
- Coordinates: 59°43′14″N 30°24′39″E
- Construction started: 1855
- Completed: 1886

Design and construction
- Architects: Aleksandr Vidov, Ippolit Monighetti

Rayevsky Manor House (Russian: Усадьба Раевского is a building of historical significance in Pushkin, Saint Petersburg. It was built in the period of 1855-1886. It is listed as an object of cultural heritage of federal significance. The building is located at numbers 34 and 36 Pushkinskaya Street.

== History ==
The estate appeared on the site of two historical sites. At the corner section (No. 311) in the 1820s housed single-storey houses of the palace stoker Heat. In the middle of the 19th century, ownership passed to A. I. Ilyin, the valet of the Grand Duke Konstantin Nikolaevich. The adjacent plot (No. 310), along Pushkinskaya Street, was owned by the out-of-town councilor I. A. Bakinovsky, for whom in 1855, according to the design of Ippolit Monighetti, a stone two-storey house was built (current house 36). By 1882 (according to other sources, in the 1870s), both sections were bought by Major-General Mikhail Rayevsky. The second house for Rayevsky (present-day house 34) was built in 1886 in the former section of Ilyin, designed by the architect Aleksandr Vidov. Somewhat earlier, Vidov expanded the first house, extending it to the east by an addition to the three axes.

After the October Revolution, both buildings were nationalized. In the beginning, both buildings were occupied by children's homes of the 1 st exemplary colony, and since 1928 they have been transferred to housing. After the Great Patriotic War, the corner house housed the district division of the KGB, in the right house - the district committee of the CPSU. Now both buildings are occupied by the district department of internal affairs.

== Architecture ==
The facade of house 36, according to the project of Monighetti, is decorated with a "boarded" rust in the ground floor and paired sandric (straight and triangular) on the edges of the house on the second floor. The house is decorated with a balcony with curved brackets and a wrought-iron lattice in three windows. After completion, although the new part was removed under the old cornice and the same elements of decoration were used, the facade became asymmetrical, the sandricks are densely located on the right edge of the facade. Composition of house 34 is similar to house 36, although it is decorated richer: the lower floor is decorated with a large rust, the window openings of the upper floor are decorated with sandricks. The entrance to the house is made on the extreme axis of the house closest to the neighbor, the decoration of the entrance is laconic, the emblem of the owner is placed above the doors.

== Literature ==
- Семенова Г. В. (2009). Царское Село: знакомое и незнакомое. М.: Центрполиграф. pp. 375–377. ISBN 978-5-9524-4249-8.

== Sources ==
- "Пушкинская 34, 36. Дома Раевских". Энциклопедия Царского Села. Archived from the original on 2018-07-11.
- "Усадьба М. Н. Раевского. Жилой дом - Районное управление внутренних дел". citywalls.ru.
- "Усадьба М. Н. Раевского. Жилой дом". citywalls.ru.
