= Nikolai Alekseievich Gladkov =

Soviet ornithologist

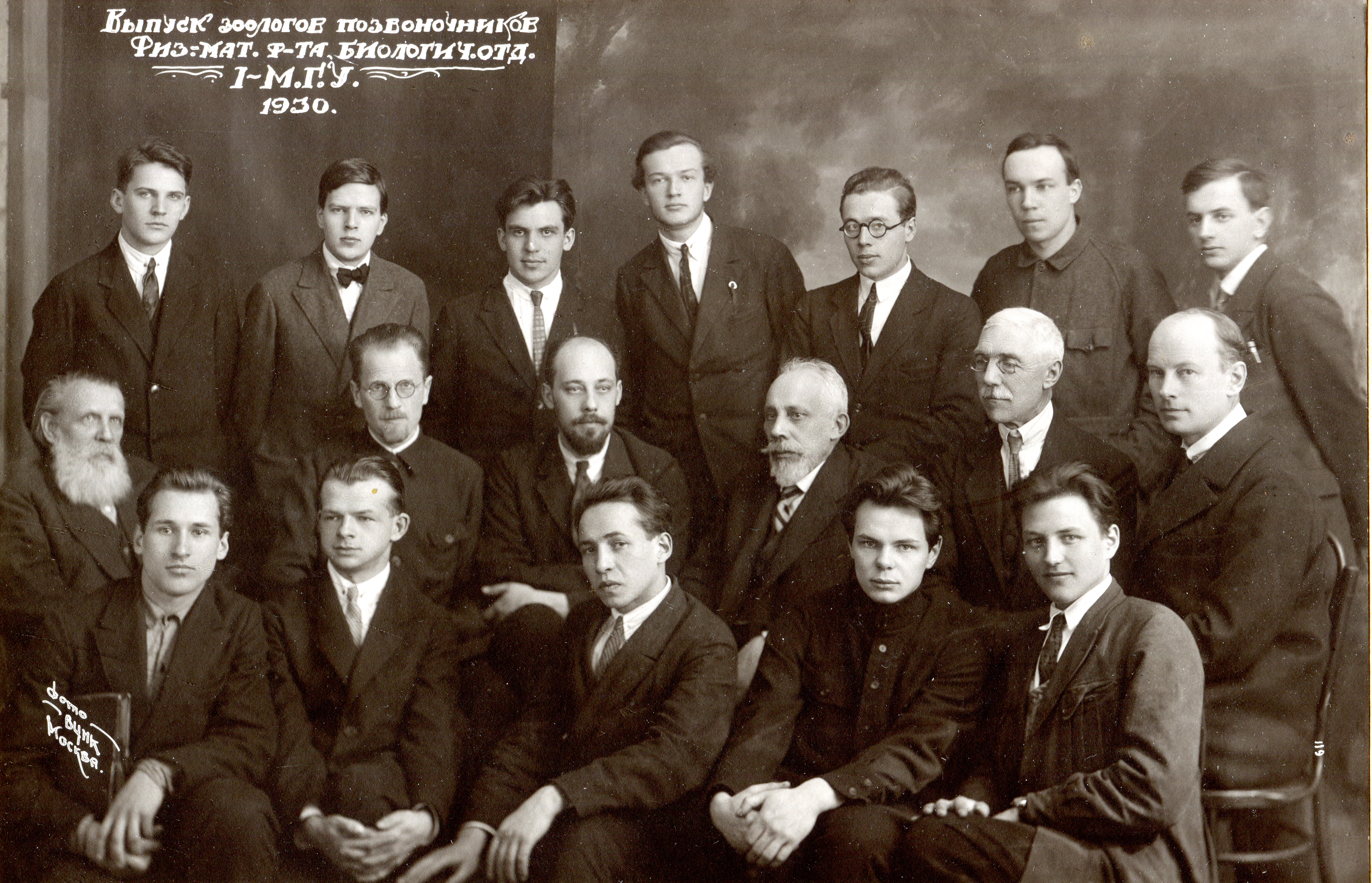
Gladkov as a student in 1930 (front row second from left)

Nikolai Alekseievich Gladkov (Russian: Николай Алексеевич Гладков; 20 March 1905 – 31 October 1975) was a Soviet ornithologist. He published a multi-volume work on the birds of the Soviet Union along with G P Dementiev and was a winner of the Stalin Prize of 1952. He served as the director of the Zoological Museum of Moscow State University from 1964 to 1969.

== Life and work ==
Gladkov was born in Kulbaki in Kursk Oblast where his father was a priest. He studied at Dmitriyev and worked in a local museum. In 1924 he went to the Aral Sea as a laboratory assistant of the Moscow Society of Naturalists. In 1926 he joined the physics and mathematics department of the Moscow State University and graduated in 1930. For a while he worked as a correspondent for the newspaper Первый университет. He went to the Staro-Pershinsky biological station at the recommendation of Mikhail Aleksandrovich Menzbier in 1926. He was a senior researcher at the Zoological Museum of the Moscow State University from 1934 and in 1938 he received a degree in biological sciences without presentation of a thesis. In 1941 he took part in the Great Patriotic War (WW II) where he was a weapons logistics commander and a sergeant. In October 1941 he was captured by the supply battalion of 247 Wehrmacht Infantry Division and was held at Kaluga. He became an interpreter and was working with other camps to hold prisoners of war. In 1942 he sent a letter to Erwin Stresemann requesting that he was available as "foreign labour" for the Zoological Museum at Berlin but it did not reach him. He sent a second letter on January 14, 1943, and Stresemann made an official request for his release to work with him. This did not work but Stresemann provided Gladkov with ornithological literature. In 1944 Gladkov visited the Rossitten Bird Observatory. Gladkov was moved to France towards the end of the war and he sent Stresemann a couple of cigarettes to show his gratitude. Stresemann was thrilled as he was smoking herbal tea due to the cigarette shortage. Gladkov was liberated by British troops on September 2, 1944.

After the war he worked as a night watchman in Moscow but continued to work on his doctoral thesis and published a couple of papers. He translated Oskar Heinroth's book on ornithology. In 1947 he defended his doctoral thesis on the biological basis of bird flight. In 1948 he became dean of the biology department at Moscow State University. He also established a course on nature conservation and wrote a textbook on zoogeography with N.A. Bobrinsky. He married Tatiana Dmitrievna Gladkova (born Chumakova), a fingerprint expert at the Anthropology Museum of the Moscow State University, in 1949.

He published over 300 works. For his six-volume work on the birds of the Soviet Union along with G.P. Dementiev, he received the Stalin Prize of the second degree in 1952.
