= Vsevolod Miller =

Russian philologist and folklorist (1848–1913)

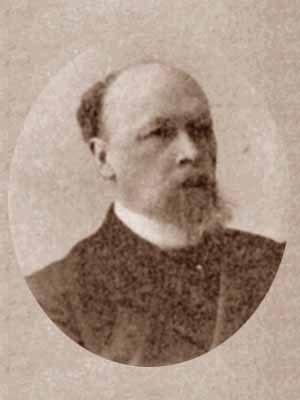
Vsevolod Miller

Vsevolod Fyodorovich Miller (Russian: Всеволод Фёдорович Миллер; 19 April [O.S. 7 April] 1848) – 18 November [O.S. 5 November] 1913) was a Russian philologist, folklorist, linguist, anthropologist, archaeologist, and academician of the Petersburg Academy of Sciences (1911).

Vsevolod Miller graduated from the Moscow State University in 1870. In 1884, he became a professor at his alma mater. In 1881, Vsevolod Miller was elected chairman of the ethnographic department of the Moscow Naturalists Society. He was one of the founders of the Ethnographic Review magazine (1889–1916), keeper of the Dashkova Ethnographic Museum in Moscow (1884–1897), and director of the Lazarev Institute of Oriental Languages (1897–1911). Vsevolod Miller was involved in the study of Indo-Iranian languages (especially Ossetian language), Russian language and folklore.

Miller was president of the Imperial Society of Devotees of Natural Science, Anthropology, and Ethnography (1889–1890).
