= Society of Devotees of Natural Science, Anthropology, and Ethnography =

Public scientific organization

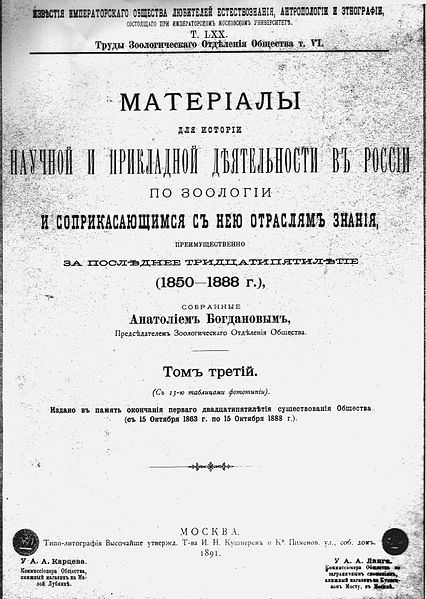
Proceedings of the Zoological Department OLEAE, 1891

The Society of Devotees of Natural Science, Anthropology, and Ethnography (OLEAE; Russian: Императорское общество любителей естествознания, антропологии и этнографии (ОЛЕАЭ)) was a public scientific organization in the Russian Empire and its successor states from 1863 to 1931. Members included scientists and professors but also educated laymen interested in the subjects as an avocation.

The society was involved in the organization of natural science expeditions, exhibitions of finds from these various missions, public science education, and promoting of funding for science in the Russian Empire and later in the USSR.

== History ==
The society was founded at Moscow University in 1863 under the name "Society of Natural Scientists". A department of anthropology was added in 1864 at the initiative of Anatoli Petrovich Bogdanov, Professor of Zoology and Anthropology at Moscow University, and other departments were added in subsequent years.

The society's first President was Gregory Ephimovich Shchurovsky and he together with other leading members of the society discussed having a museum. Their first move in this direction was to establish a library this held books documenting the history of science and technology. This became the central polytechnic library but this established their ambitions. In 1871 Moscow council set aside half a million roubles to create a museum. A committee was formed with Grand Duke Konstantin Nikolayevich as honorary chair. The formation of a museum was timely as Peter the Great's 200th anniversary would inspire an exhibition that would be used to launch the new Polytechnic Museum.

== An expedition to Turkestan ==
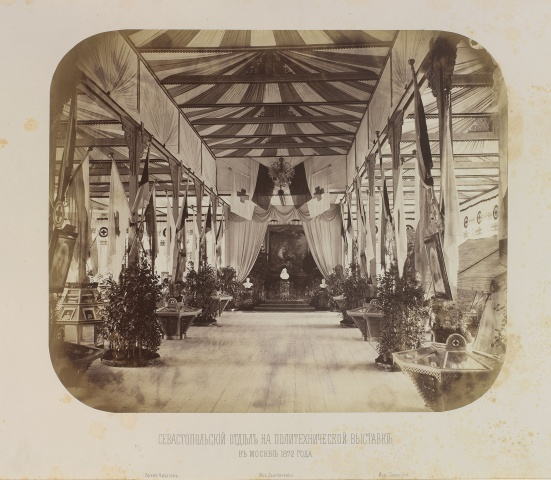
1872 All-Russian Technical Exhibition (by Ivan Grigoryevich Dyagovchenko) which was organised by this society and which created the Polytechnic Museum

In 1868 Alexei Pavlovich Fedchenko was recommended by the society to undertake a hazardous mission to recently conquered region of Russian Turkestan. His wife Olga Fedchenko was a full, but unpaid, member of the team. The mission was hazardous because Turkestan was still transitioning to becoming part of the Russian Empire. Fedchenko had been recommended to the first Governor-General Konstantin von Kaufman. Kaufman wanted an investigation of what he saw as a "newly and scarcely explored region". Kaufman set up a Tashkent outpost of this society. The Fenchenkos made three separate explorations between 1868 and 1872. Kaufman was targeting the 1872 Moscow All-Russian Technical Exhibition as an opportunity to display their research. Alexei died in 1873 in a climbing accident on Mont Blanc Olga buried her husband at Chamonix and at the request of the society continued to publish their work.

In 1871 the society changed its name to "Society of Devotees of Natural Science, Anthropology, and Ethnography"

The society published various journals including Proceedings of the Society of Natural History, Anthropology and Ethnography (1863–1917), Ethnographic Review (1889–1917), Geography (1894–1924), and Russian Journal of Anthropology (1900–1916). The society took the lead in establishing the Polytechnical Museum in Moscow, opened on December 12, 1872. Society members won numerous awards and medals for their work, For its contributions to Russian science the society was permitted to style itself "Imperial Society of Devotees of Natural Science, Anthropology, and Ethnography".

In 1931 the society was merged into the Moscow Society of Natural Scientists.

== Presidents of the society ==
- G. E. Shchurovsky (1863–1884)
- August Yulevich Davidov (1884–1885)
- Anatoli Petrovich Bogdanov (1886–1889)
- Vsevolod Fyodorovich Miller (1889–1890)
- Dmitry Nikolayevich Anuchin (1890–1923)
- Alexei Nikolaevich Severtsov (1923–1931)
