= Alexander Yanshin =

- Russian: Александр Леонидович Яншин
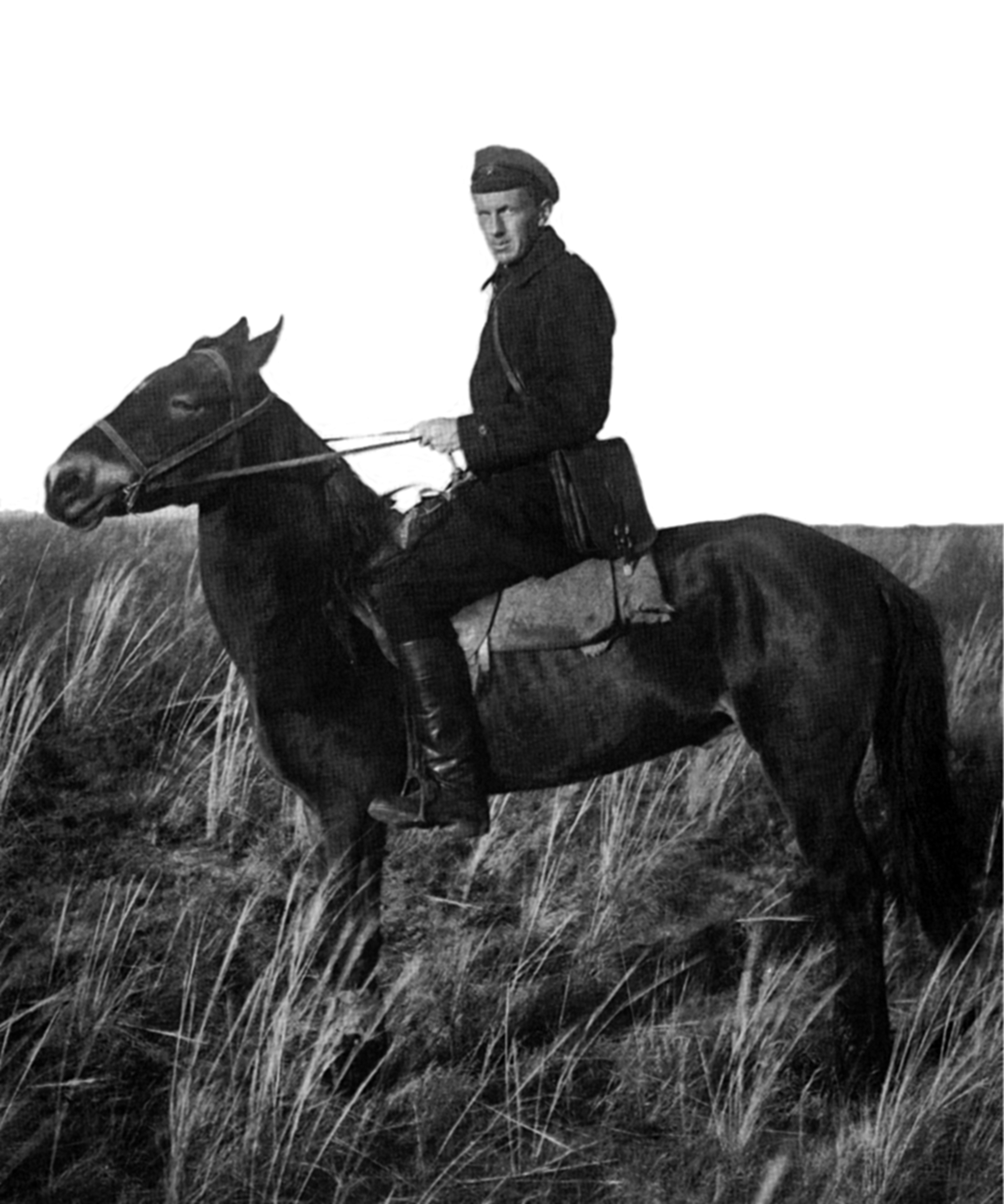
- Born: 1911; Smolensk
- Died: 1999 (aged 87–88); Moscow
- Education: USSR Academy of Sciences
- Scientific career
- Fields: geology
- Workplaces: USSR Academy of Sciences

Alexander Leonidovich Yanshin (Russian: Александр Леонидович Яншин; 1911, Smolensk – 1999, Moscow) was a Soviet Russian geologist and academician of the USSR Academy of Sciences (since 1958). From 1982 to 1988, Yanshin served as vice-president of the USSR Academy of Sciences. From 1967, Yanshin served as president of the Moscow Society of Naturalists.

His father was a lawyer. He studied at the Moscow State University.

He received the Candidate's degree from the USSR Academy of Sciences in 1937. In 1952, he defended his doctoral dissertation. He was elected a Member of the USSR Academy of Sciences in 1958.

== Honors and awards ==
- Order of the Red Banner of Labour (1944)
- Order of the Badge of Honour (1945)
- Alexander Karpinsky Prize (1953)
- Order of Lenin (1967, 1971, 1981)
- USSR State Prize (1969, 1978)
- Alexander Karpinsky Gold Medal (1973)
- Hero of Socialist Labour (1981)
- Order of the October Revolution (1986)
- Alexander Pavlovich Vinogradov Prize (1994)
