= Schtschurowskia =

Scientific classification
- Kingdom: Plantae
- Clade: Tracheophytes
- Clade: Angiosperms
- Clade: Eudicots
- Clade: Asterids
- Order: Apiales
- Family: Apiaceae
- Subfamily: Apioideae
- Tribe: Pyramidoptereae
- Genus: Schtschurowskia; Regel & Schmalh.

Genus of flowering plant

Schtschuriowskia is a genus of flowering plants belonging to the family Apiaceae.

Its native range is Central Asia and the Balkans and is found in Kazakhstan, Kyrgyzstan, Albania, Kosovo, Greece, Tajikistan and Uzbekistan.

The genus name of Schtschuriowskia is in honour of Gregory Ephimovich Shchurovsky (1803–1884), a Russian Professor of geology in Moscow. It was first described and published in Izv. Imp. Obshch. Lyubit. Estestv. Moskovsk. Univ. Vol.34 (Issue 2) on page 40 in 1882.

== Known species ==
According to Kew:

- Schtschurowskia margaritae Korovin
- Schtschurowskia meifolia Regel & Schmalh.

== Orthography and linguistics ==
The Schtschuriowskia's name is known in linguistics for being a word with one of the highest numbers of consecutive consonants. The first seven letters represent one Cryllic sound (the voiceless alveolo-palatal fricative), represented in Russian by "щ".
