= Ippolit Monighetti =

Russian architect (1819–1878)

- Ипполит Монигетти
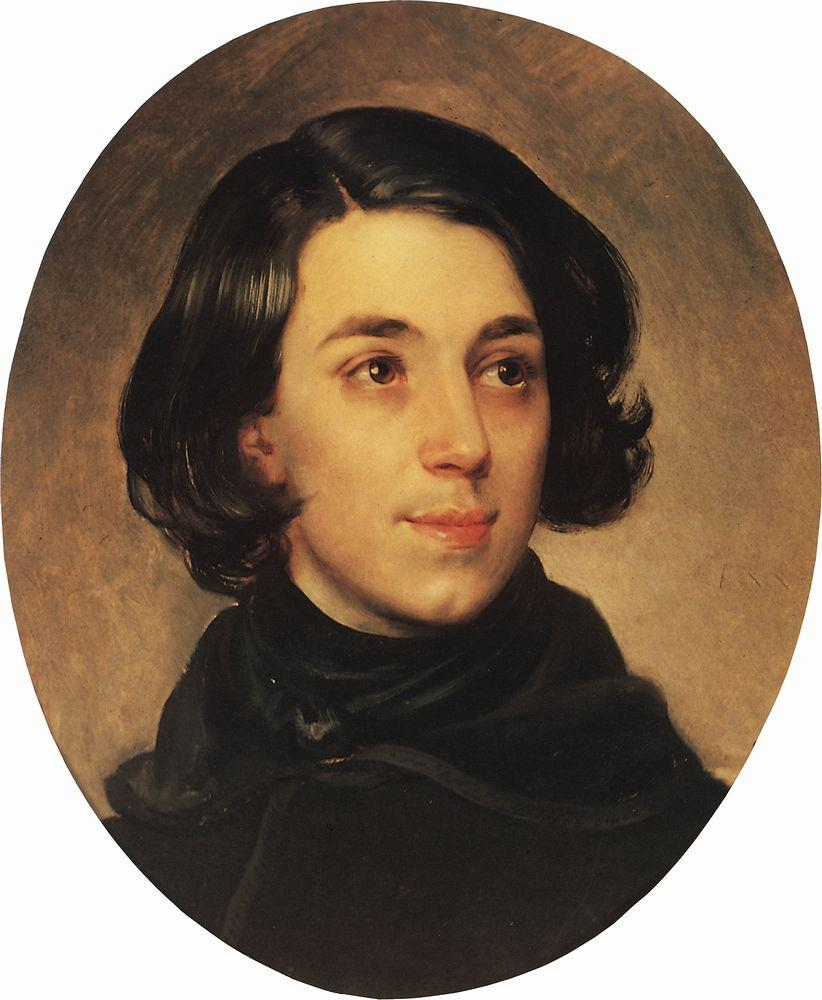
- Portrait by Karl Bryullov (1840)
- Born: 5 January 1819; Moscow, Russia
- Died: 10 May 1878 (aged 59); Saint Petersburg, Russia
- Education: Member Academy of Arts (1847); Professor by rank (1858)
- Alma mater: Stroganov Art School, Imperial Academy of Arts
- Known for: Painting, architecture
- Style: Eclecticism

Ippolit Antonovich Monighetti (Russian: Ипполит Антонович Монигетти; 17 January [O.S. 5 January] 1819 – 22 May [O.S. 10 May] 1878) was a Russian architect of Swiss descent. He worked for the Romanov family and was a member and professor by rank of the Imperial Academy of Arts.

== Biography ==
Monighetti attended the Stroganov Art School and then studied at the Imperial Academy of Arts under Alexander Brullov, matriculating in 1839 with a gold medal. His extensive journeys in Egypt and Italy in the 1840s predetermined his interest in revivalist architecture.

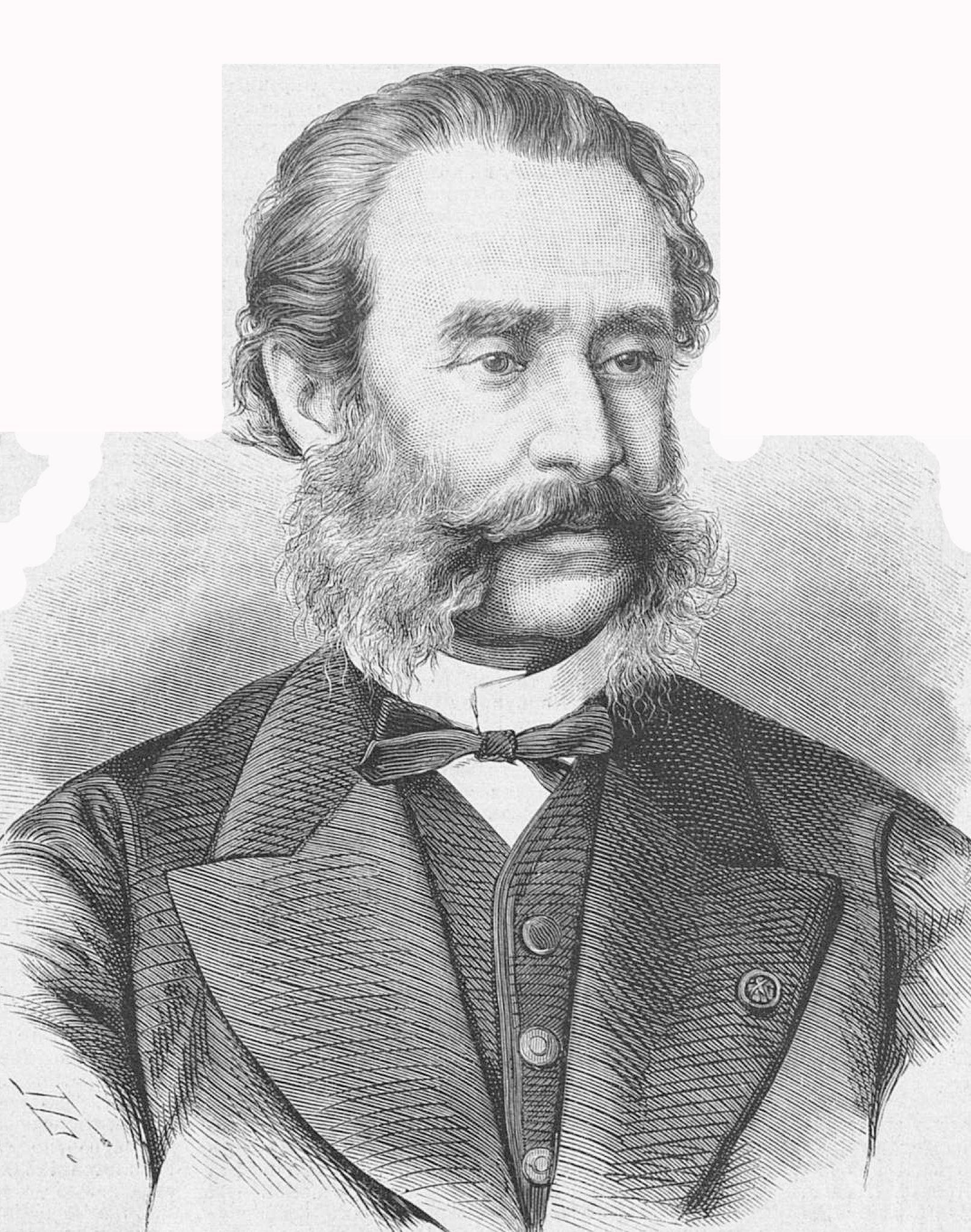
Ippolit Monighetti (1878)

Monighetti started his career as a fashionable architect by designing a cluster of villas in Tsarskoe Selo, notable those for Princess Yusupov and Prince Bagration. In 1850, he was commissioned by Nicholas I of Russia to stylise a Turkish bathhouse in the Catherine Park as a little mosque. In the 1860s, Monighetti was responsible for refurbishing several rooms of the Catherine Palace.

On the strength of his success in Tsarskoe Selo, Monighetti was asked by Alexander II to design his summer residence in Livadiya, Crimea. Of his Crimean structures, only the neo-Byzantine church of the Livadia Palace still stands. He also refurbished the imperial yachts Livadia and Derzhava.

In the 1870s, Monighetti designed new interiors for the Skierniewice Palace (near Warsaw), Anichkov Palace and the Yusupov Palace (both in Saint Petersburg). At the end of his life, Monighetti became interested in the Russian Revival. He applied the newly fashionable style to the Polytechnical Museum in Moscow, the Russian church in Vevey, Switzerland, and the sepulchre for Alexander II's illegitimate children in Tsarskoe Selo.

== Works ==
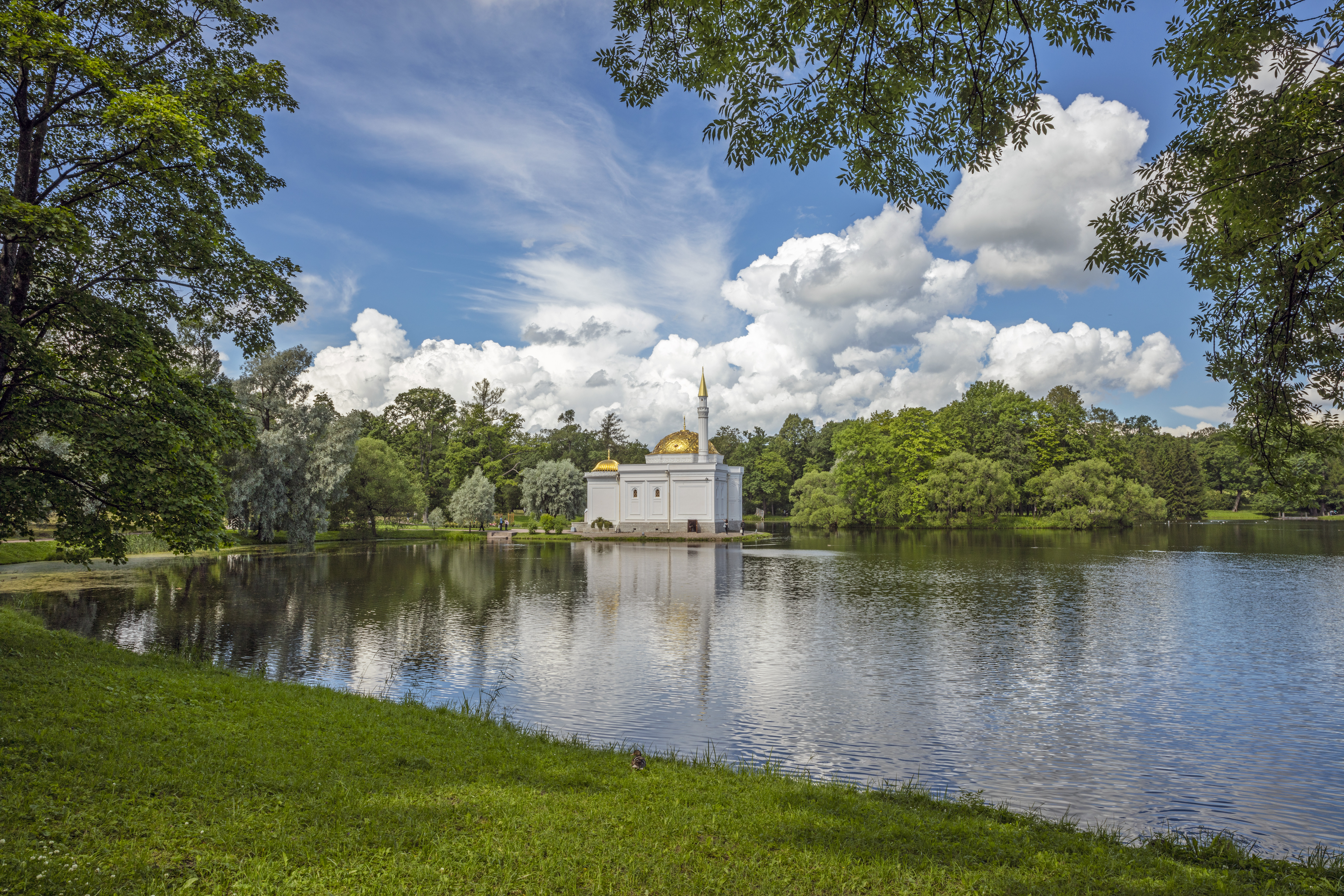
The Turkish Bath at Tsarskoye Selo

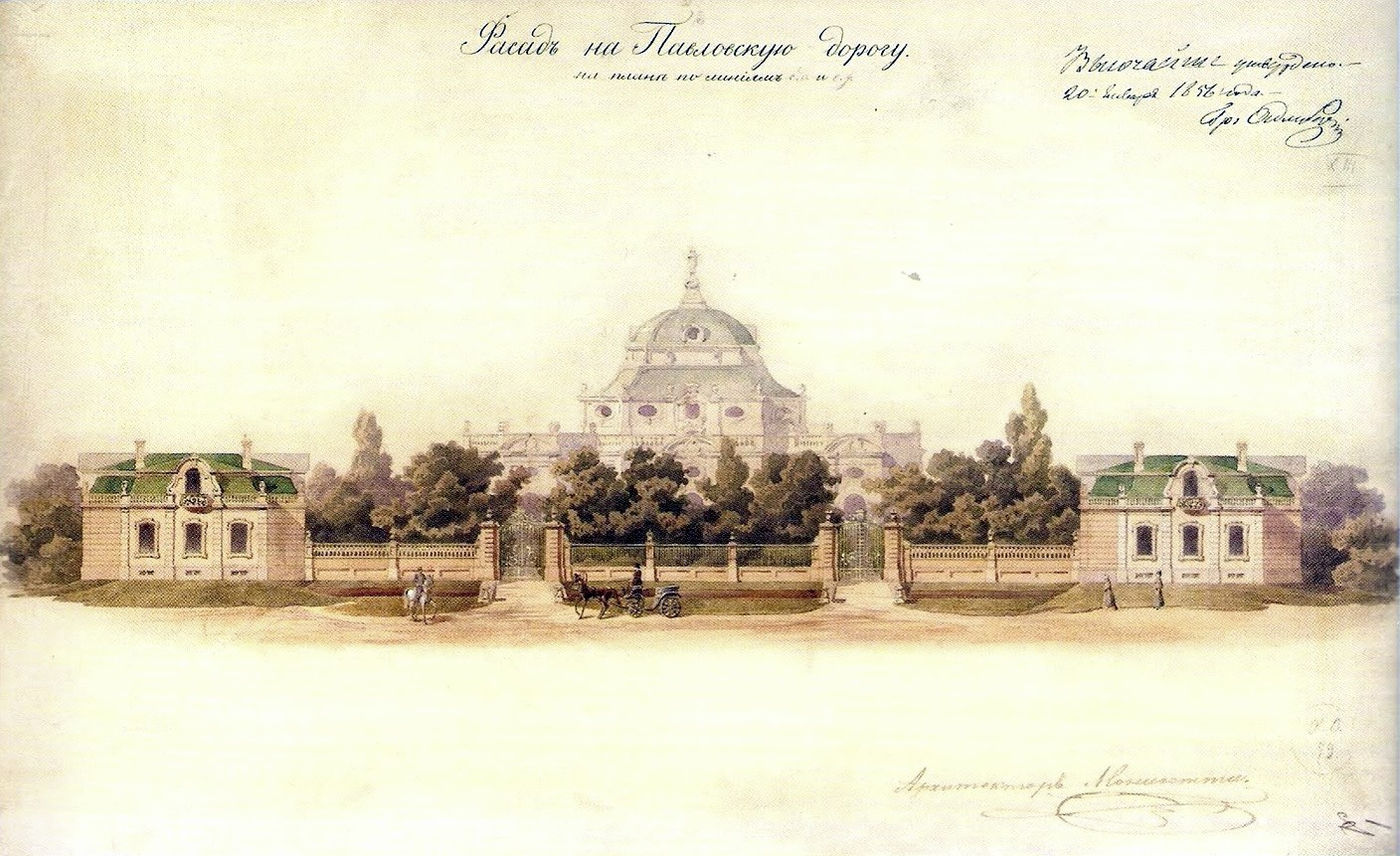
Monighetti's plan for the Yusupov Villa (1856)

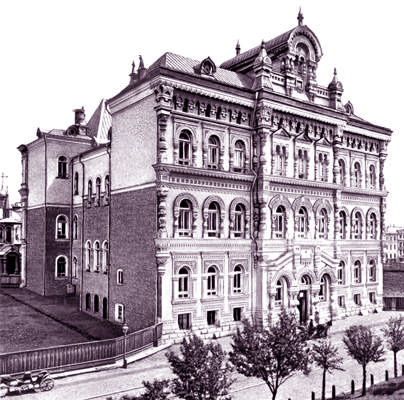
Draft plan of the Polytechnic Museum in Moscow (1880s)
