= Alexander Elenkin =

Russian lichenologist (1873–1942)

Alexander Elenkin

Alexander Alexandrovich Elenkin (1873–1942, Russian: Еленкин, Александр Александрович) was a lichenologist in the Russian Empire and the Soviet Union. He was born in Warsaw and took his degree in botany at the University of Warsaw, graduating in 1893. He became an assistant there in 1898. The next year he became conservator and director of the Cryptogamic Department at the Imperial Botanic Garden of Saint Petersburg. Since 1901 Elenkin issued the exsiccata series Lichenes florae Rossiae et regionum confinium orientalium. In 1901, Elenkin published a critical note on Viktor Pisarzhevsky's literature-based checklist of lichens recorded from the Russian Empire. In 1931 the Botanic Garden was merged into the Botanical Institute and he became a professor there. He is known as the "father of Russian lichenology" and wrote many works on the subject. He died in 1942, in Kazan, where he temporarily lived and worked with all the rest of the staff of the Botanical Institute while being in evacuation status from Leningrad.

The standard author abbreviation Elenkin is used to indicate this person as the author when citing a botanical name.

== See also ==
- Category:Taxa named by Alexander Elenkin
