= Moscow Society of Naturalists =

Russian learned society for the natural sciences (founded 1805)

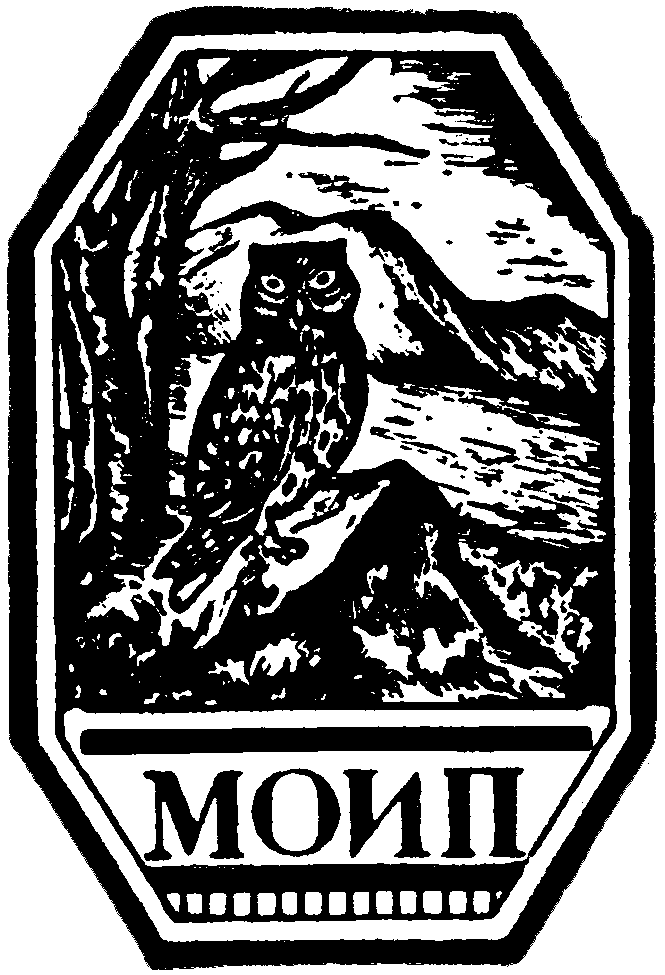
MOIP

Moscow Society of Naturalists (Russian: Московское общество испытателей природы (MOIP)) is one of Russia's oldest learned societies.

In 1805 it was founded as the Imperial Society of Naturalists of Moscow (French: Société Impériale des Naturalistes de Moscou) under the auspices of two noblemen, Mikhail Muravyov and Alexis Razumovsky, by Johann Fischer von Waldheim in 1805. Princess Zenaǐde Wolkonsky made a gift of her own library to the society.

The tasks of the society were considered to be the development of general scientific problems of natural science, the study of the natural resources of Russia, including "the discovery of such works, which could constitute a new branch of Russian trade."

From the very beginning of its existence, the society began organizing expeditions and excursions to study the nature of Russia and collect natural history collections. MOIP organized expeditions to explore Altai, the Urals, the Caucasus, Kamchatka and other regions of Russia. After the study, the materials of the expeditions were transferred to the corresponding museums and offices of Moscow University. Over time, famous travelers (researchers themselves) began to send the society materials of their observations, descriptions of trips, as well as exhibits for collections (from Java, Alaska, Malaya, Persia, Japan, Asia Minor, Brazil, etc.). As a result, most of the collections of the Zoological Museum of Moscow University, as well as University herbariums and mineralogical and paleontological collections of Moscow University, were collected by members of the MOIP.

Such cultural institutions as the Polytechnical Museum and Zoological Museum, founded by MOIP member Professor Anatoli Bogdanov, and University Herbarium founded by MOIP member professor ordinarius Veniaminov P.D. used to be affiliated with the society. It has published its own bimonthly journal, Bulletin de la Société Impériale des Naturalistes de Moscou, since 1826. The society's journal has published work in lichenology, including Viktor Pisarzhevsky's 1898 checklist of lichens recorded from Russia.

== Presidents ==
Previous presidents include:

- 1805—1817 — Alexey Razumovsky,
- 1817—1825 — Andrey Petrovich Obolensky
- 1825—1830 — Alexander Pisarev
- 1830—1835 — Dmitry Golitsyn
- 1835—1847 — Sergei Grigoriyevich Stroganov
- 1847—1849 — Д. П. Голохвастов
- 1850—1855 — В. И. Назимов
- 1856—1859 — Е. П. Ковалевский
- 1859—1863 — Н. В. Исаков
- 1863—1867 — Д. С. Левшин
- 1867—1872 — А. П. Ширинский-Шихматов
- 1872—1884 — А. Г. Фишер фон Вальдгейм
- 1884—1886 — К. И. Ренар
- 1886—1890 — Fyodor Bredikhin
- 1890—1897 — Ф. А. Слудский
- 1897—1915 — Н. А. Умов
- 1915—1935 — Mikhail Aleksandrovich Menzbier
- 1935—1953 — Nikolay Zelinsky
- 1955—1967 — Vladimir Sukachev
- 1967—1999 — Alexander Yanshin
- 2000 on — Viktor Sadovnichiy (MGUs Rector)
