= Iustin Dyadkovsky =

Russian physician

Iustin Evdokimovich Dyadkovsky or Justin Dyadkvosky (Russian: Иустин Евдокимович Дядьковский, 12 June 1784 – 2 August 1841) was a Russian medical doctor, psychotherapist, rationalist, and natural philosopher. He was a professor at Moscow University and taught materialistic views, rejecting vitalism. He was forced to resign for holding "blasphemous" views in 1836.

Justin was born in the village of Dyatkovo, where his father was a priest (sexton), and received his early education at the Ryazan seminary. He studied medicine from 1809 and graduated in 1812. He served in the army during the Patriotic War for two years and joined back as an assistant. His thesis for his doctorate in 1816 was on "Discourse on the effect of drugs on the human body". He became a professor in 1824 and was involved in cholera prevention from 1830. Among his ideas was classifying diseases as being with or without fever. And among those that did not include fever, he included diseases of the nervous system, including psychiatric ailments. He was among the first to explore bibliotherapy, reading as a therapy for certain psychiatric conditions. He was forced to resign from the university in 1836 for supposedly blasphemous views. The specific cause was that he had taught students that under certain conditions, dead bodies do not decompose but mummify, and thus suggested an alternative to miracles ascribed to saints. His beliefs included that the organic world was derived from the inorganic through transformations and special conditions. He saw life as a continuous series of physicochemical processes and held that all the physical and chemical laws continued to be followed in living organisms, contrary to vitalist viewpoints. He also opposed idealists and claimed that "experience was the sole source of knowledge".
