= Livadia (yacht) =

Two royal yachts of the House of Romanov of the Russian Empire were named Livadia, after the Livadia Palace:

- Russian yacht Livadia (1873), launched in 1873 and sunk in 1878
- Russian yacht Livadia (1880), experimental ship launched in 1880 and retired in 1880
