= Georgi Dementiev =

Soviet ornithologist (1898–1965)

Georgi Petrovich Dementiev (Russian: Гео́ргий Петро́вич Деме́нтьев; 5 July, 1898 – 14 April, 1969) was a Russian and Soviet ornithologist and professor at the University of Moscow. His studies based on museum collections and collaboration with others, notably N. A. Gladkov, resulted in a major six-volume work on the birds of the Soviet Union which was published between 1951 and 1954. He had a special interest in the birds of prey.

== Biography ==
Dementiev was born in Peterhof, where his father was a physician. He studied at the local gymnasium and joined the University of St Petersburg. Although interested in birds from a young age, his parents wished that he studied law. In 1920 he moved to Moscow to work as a lawyer. Although he had no formal qualifications in biology, he was well read and was fluent in French, German, Polish, Italian and Swedish. He began his research under Mikhail Menzbier and joined the museum at Moscow in 1927 to join S.A. Buturlin to work on a guide to the birds of the USSR which was published in 1934–40. He became a curator in 1932 and stayed in the position until 1947 when he joined the biology department. He was mostly into museum ornithology and was an expert on identification and taxonomy taking a special interest in the birds of prey, especially the falcons. During the invasion by the Germany, the Moscow University collections were moved to Ashgabat, Turkmenistan. Dementiev and other studied the region while posted there and it became one of the best studied parts of the erstwhile Soviet Union. Two of his fellow ornithologist, V. M. Modestov and J.M. Kaftanowski however were drafted into the army and died at the front. Dementiev's manuscript on the Gyrfalcons and falconry with colour plates by Vasily Vatagin were lost and Dementiev rewrote it and published it in 1951. The six volume Birds of the Soviet Union published with N.A. Gladkov between 1951 and 1954 is still a major reference.

In 1952 he was appointed by the Soviet Academy of Sciences as Vice Chairman of the Commission on Nature Reserves which later became the Commission on Nature Conservation. He was elected Honorary Vice-president at the Fifth IUCN Assembly at Edinburgh in 1956. Dementiev was married to Maria Grigorievna Golubeva (1900–1970) and their daughter Maria Georgievna Vakhrameeva became an evolutionary biologist.
