= Mikhail Menzbier =

Russian ornithologist (1855–1935)

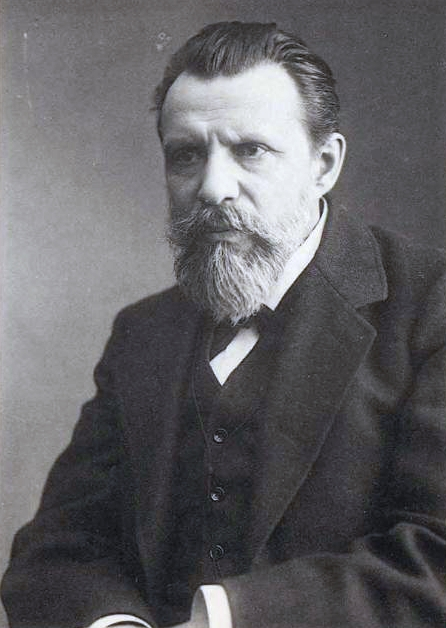
Mikhail Menzbier in 1911

Mikhail Aleksandrovich Menzbier (Russian: Михаил Александрович Мензбир; 23 October 1855 – 10 October 1935) was a Russian and Soviet ornithologist. He was a professor of comparative anatomy at the Moscow University and promoted an evolutionary view of faunistics in the Soviet Union. He also studied the birds of prey, published a textbook of zoology, and a two volume work on the birds of Russia.

== Life and work ==
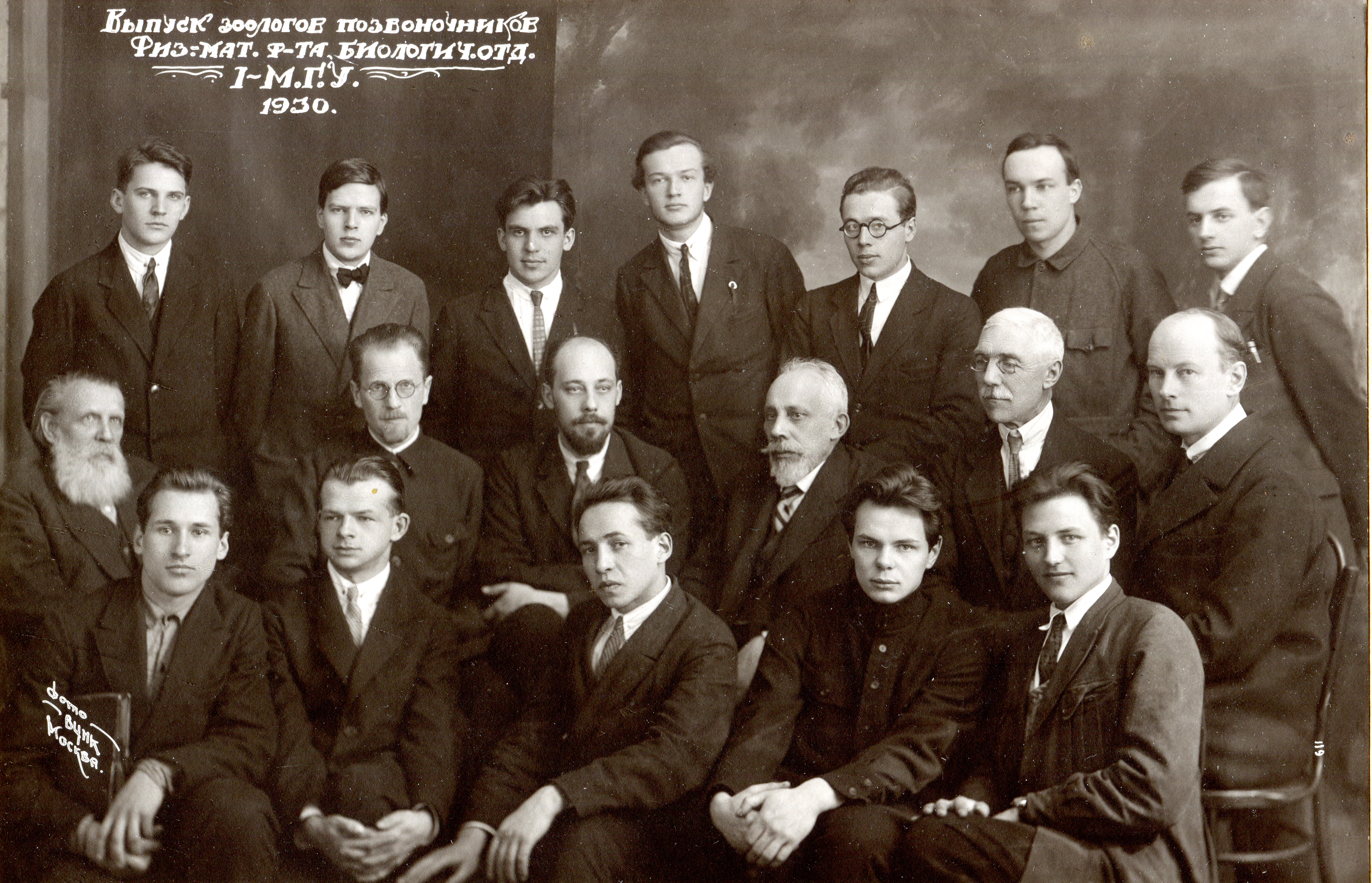
Menzbier (left most bearded) with colleagues and students at Moscow University in 1930

Menzbir was born in Tula where his father was an ensign who came from impoverished noble ancestry. His mother died when he was eleven and his interest in nature was sparked by his home tutor A.N. Nikitin. He also had access to the library of N.I. Belkin. He graduated from the Tula Gymnasium in 1874 after an interruption due to a typhus infection. He joined Moscow University in 1874 where he was influenced by Yakov Andreevich Borzenkov (1825-1883), Sergei Alexandrovich Usov (1827-1886), Karl Rouillier (1814-1858), Anatoly Petrovich Bogdanov (1834-1896) and his PhD advisor was Nikolai Alekseevich Severtsov (1827-1885). Timiryazev was a friend. He defended his doctoral thesis on the zoogeography of birds in 1882. He then travelled through Europe examining museum collections and began to work on the taxonomy of the birds of prey. He returned to Moscow and became a privatdozent in 1884. Two years later, at the age of 31, he became one of the youngest professors at Moscow University. Menzbier was a professor of comparative anatomy at Moscow University from 1886 until 1911, when he resigned in protest against the oppressive treatment of students there. He then joined the Shanyavsky Moscow City People's University. Following the Russian Revolution in 1917 he returned to Moscow University where he became Rector. His students included P.P. Sushkin, S.A. Buturlin, Aleksandr Kots, N.A. Bobrinsky, G.P. Dementiev, V. B. Banjkovsky, and V.G. Geptner. Menzbier wrote a textbook on zoology in 1887 which went into several editions. He also published a two volume work on the birds of Russia.

Menzbier was a founding member of Russia's first ornithological body, the Kessler Ornithological Society. Menzbier was a supporter of Darwinism. He has been described as "one of the most consistent defenders of the classical Darwinian approach to the struggle for existence and of the selection theory in general." Apart from being a member of the Russian Academy of Sciences, Menzbier was elected an honorary member of the British Ornithologists' Union and the Deutsche Ornithologen-Gesellschaft, and a corresponding member of the Zoological Society of London, of the Société zoologique de France and the American Ornithologists' Union. He is commemorated in the names of Menzbier's marmot and the Menzbier Ornithological Society.
