= Yury Gladkov =

Soviet politician

Yury Pavlovich Gladkov (Russian: Юрий Павлович Гладков, January 22, 1949 in Leningrad, Soviet Union – October 5, 2007 in Saint Petersburg) was a Soviet politician.

Since 1990, he was a member of St. Petersburg Legislative Assembly and its predecessors. In 2003 he became the Deputy of its Speaker.
