= Polytechnic Museum =

Science museum in Moscow, Russia

The Polytechnic Museum
- Политехнический музей
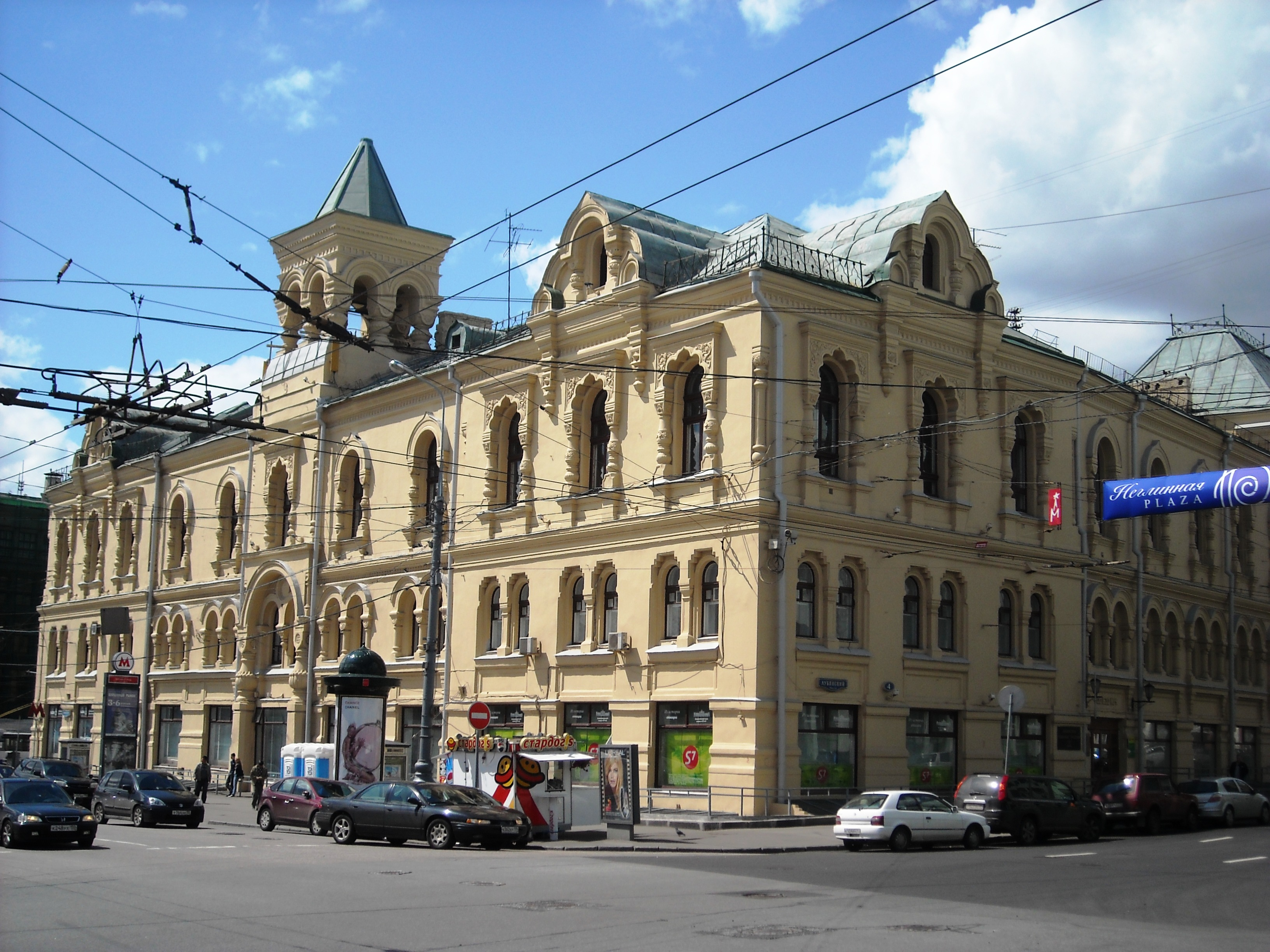
- Polytechnic Museum, 2010

- Location within Moscow
- Established: 1872
- Location: Moscow, Russia
- Coordinates: 55°45′20″N 37°36′35″E
- Type: Science Museum
- Collection size: circa 220,000 items in 65 halls
- Website: polymus.ru/eng/

The Polytechnic Museum (Russian: Политехнический музей) is one of the oldest science museums in the world and is located in Moscow. It showcases Russian and Soviet technology and science, as well as modern inventions. It was founded in 1872 after the first All-Russian Technical Exhibition on the bicentennial anniversary of the birth of Peter the Great at the initiative of the Society of Devotees of Natural Science, Anthropology, and Ethnography. The first stage of the museum was designed by Ippolit Monighetti and completed in 1877. The north wing was added in 1896 and the south wing in 1907.

The Polytechnic Museum is the largest technical museum in Russia, and houses a wide range of historical inventions and technological achievements, including humanoid automata of the 18th century, and the first Soviet computers. The collection contains over 220,000 items in 65 halls including, chemistry, mining, metallurgy, transport, energy, optics, automation, computer engineering, radio electronics, communications, and space exploration. Highlights include the first achromatic telescope; an early solar microscope by German anatomists Johann Nathanael Lieberkühn; an early seismograph by Boris Borisovich Galitzine; galvanoplastics by Moritz von Jacobi; and early electric lights by Pavel Yablochkov.

== History ==
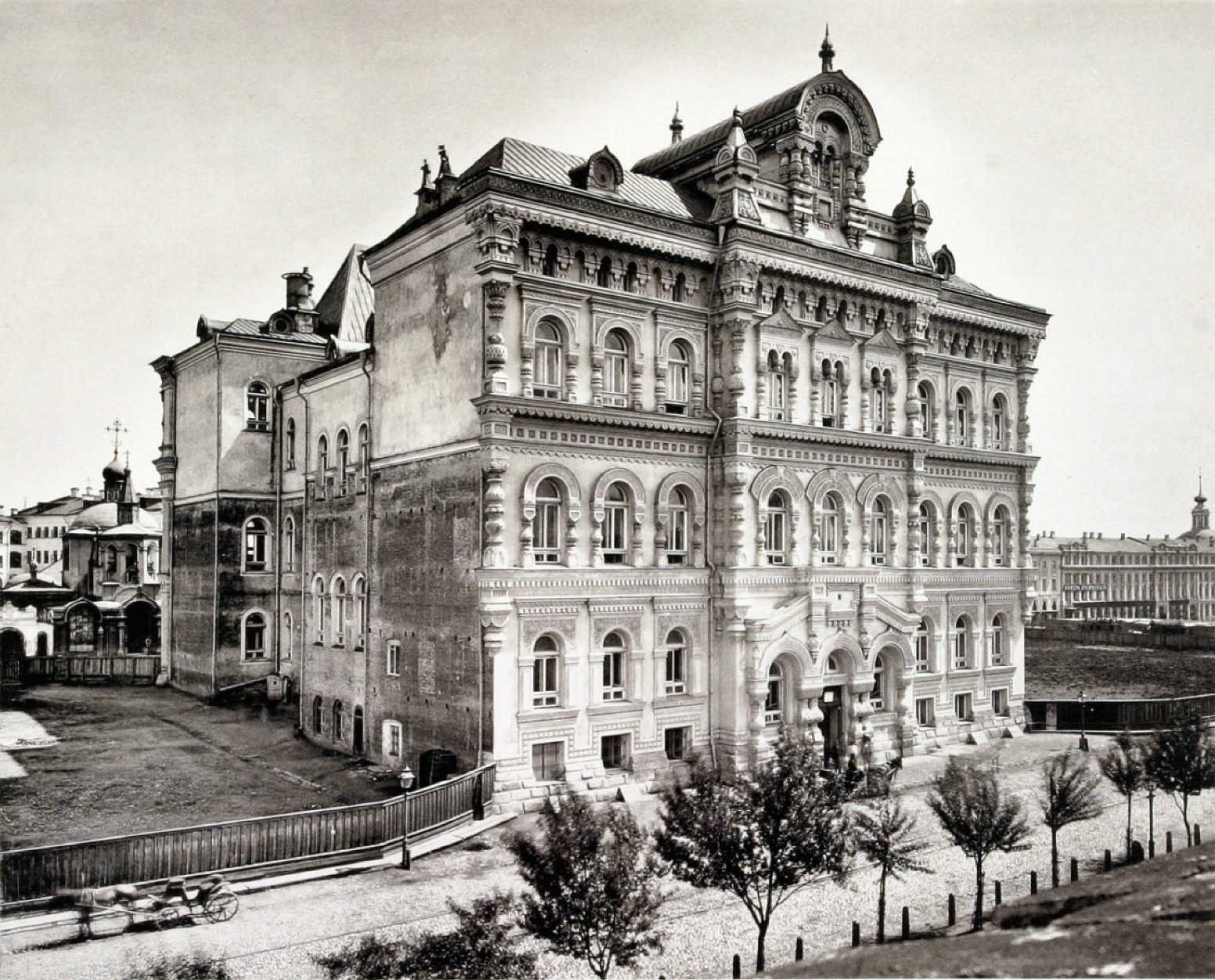
The first stage of Polytechnic Museum building, photographed in 1884.

The Society of Devotees of Natural Science was formed in Moscow in 1863. The society's first President was Gregory Ephimovich Shchurovsky and he together with other leading members of the society discussed having a museum. Their first move in this direction was to establish a library this held books documenting the history of science and technology. This became the Central Polytechnic Library but this established their ambitions. In 1871 Moscow council set aside half a million roubles to create a museum. A committee was formed with Grand Duke Konstantin Nikolayevich as an honorary chair. The formation of a museum was timely as Peter the Great's 200th anniversary would inspire the All-Russian Technical Exhibition that would be used to launch the new museum. Since June 2023, the president of the museum is the head of the Kurchatov Institute, Mikhail Kovalchuk.

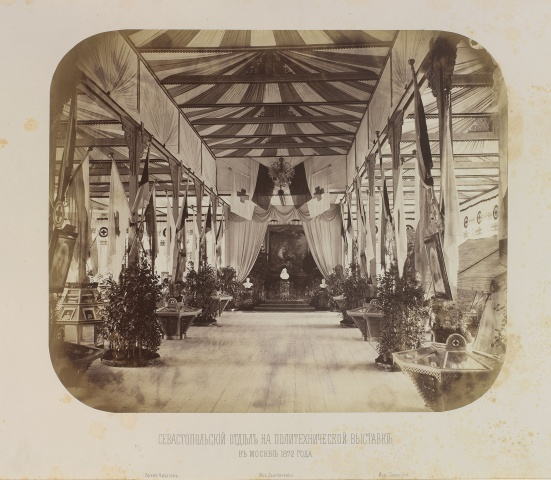
1872 All-Russian Technical Exhibition in Moscow by Ivan Dyagovchenko.

== Collections ==
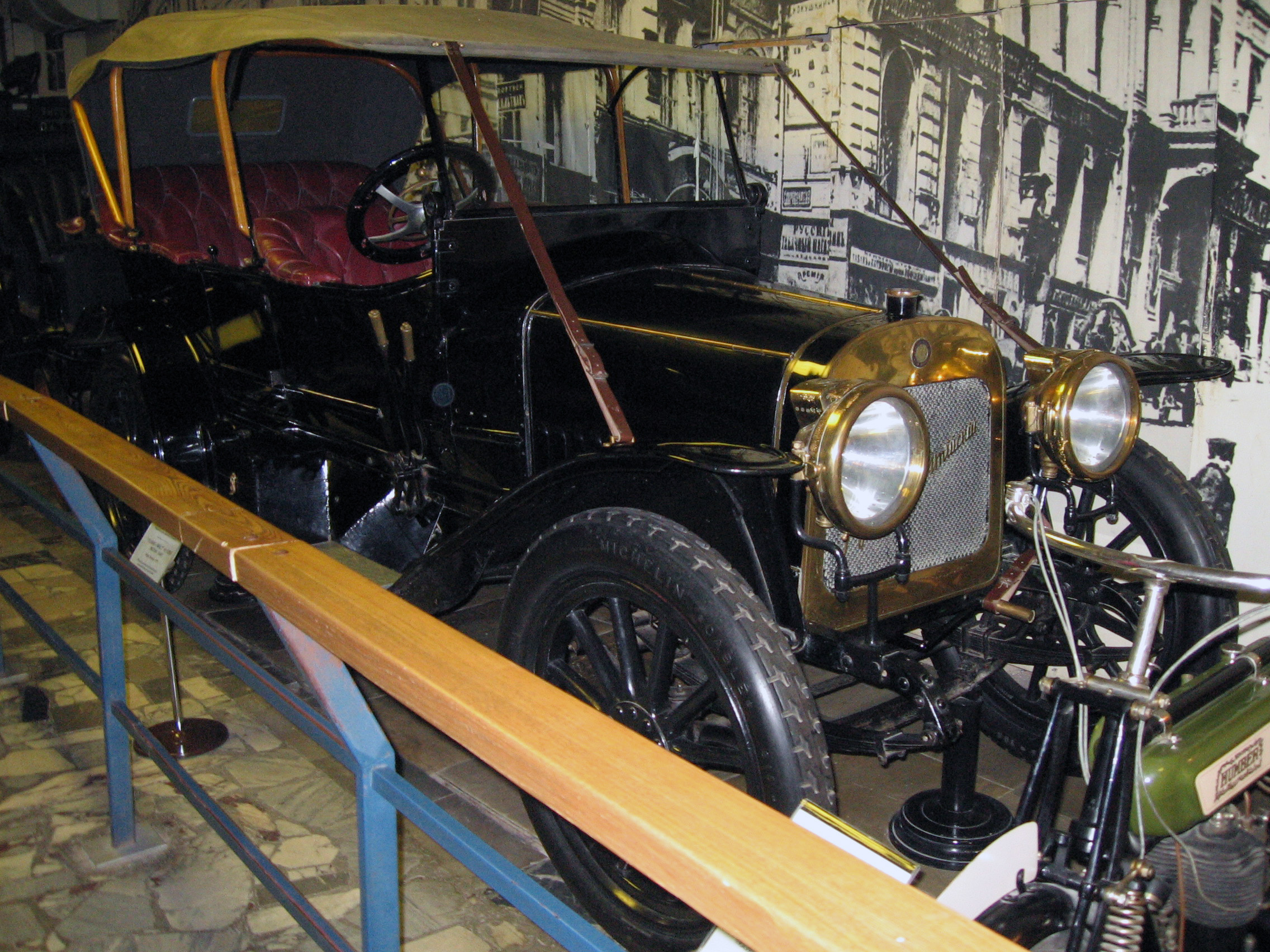
Russo-Balt K12/20 released in 1911 in Polytechnical Museum (Moscow)

As of January 1, 2013 the museum fund of the museum consisted of 229,348 items.

The collection of computing equipment is the most comprehensive display in Russia and includes rare copyrights devices, such as automated abacus by Viktor Bunyakovsky, one of the first models of Odner's adding machine, the only surviving copy of the domestic computer "Ural", hydraulic integrator by Vladimir Lukyanov, the world's only computer based on ternary logic, "Syetun" and many other rarities.

== Modernization ==
On the basis of the decree of the Ministry of Culture of the Russian Federation, the Development Fund of the Polytechnic Museum held a tender for the development of the museum concept. As a result of a choice from 14 competitive bids provided by Russian and foreign companies specializing in museum design, British company Event Communications was selected.

== Public lectures ==
In addition to its function as a museum, the Polytechnic Museum has been an important place for the dissemination of science and culture in Russian. From 1913 to 1918 it was the centre of discussions about Russian avant-garde, with public lectures given by Vladimir Mayakovsky, David Burlyuk, Andrei Bely, Alexei Kruchenykh, Velimir Khlebnikov. In the period of the Khrushchev thaw, its main auditorium was the place for public performances of Andrei Voznesensky, Robert Rozhdestvensky and Bulat Okudzhava. This was also a place for popular science lectures given by Élie Metchnikoff, Alexander Fersman and Niels Bohr.
