= Karl Rouillier =

French-Russian zoologist and geologist (1814–1858)

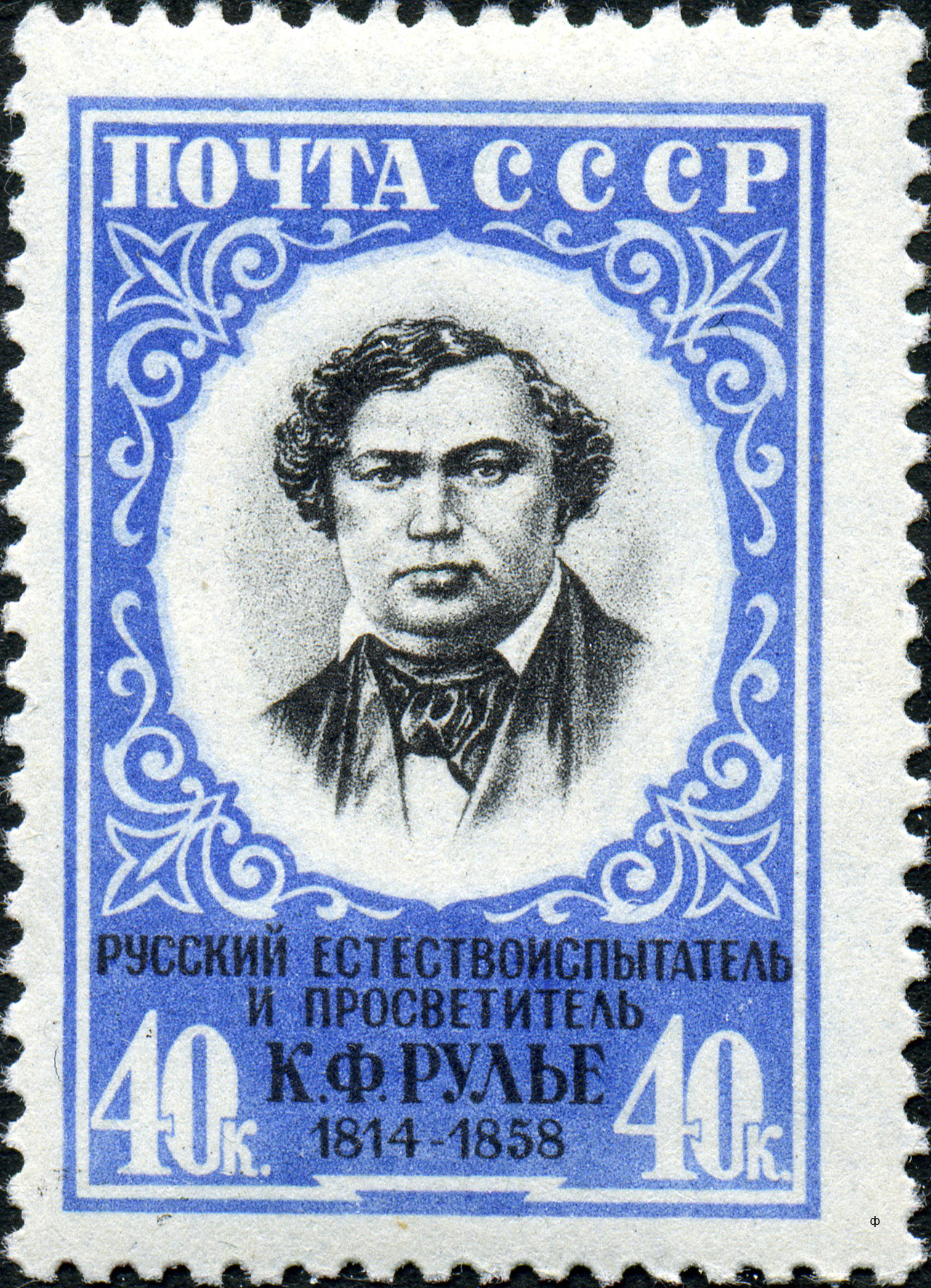
Karl Rouillier on a Soviet postal stamp

Karl Franzevich Rouillier or Rul'e (Russian: Карл Францович Рулье, romanized: Karl Frantsovich Rulye; 20 April 1814 – 21 April 1858) was a Russian zoologist, geologist, paleontologist and professor of French origin who introduced ideas and approaches to understanding evolution in Russia, questioning the paradigm of the time of species being fixed and unchanging from the time of Biblical Creation.

== Life and work ==
Rouillier was born in Nizhny Novgorod, Russia, to a French shoemaker and his wife, Anna Yakovlevna, who worked as a midwife. He studied medicine in Moscow, where his teachers included Fischer von Waldheim, and Iustin Dyadkovsky (1784–1841). He graduated and became a military doctor in 1833. In 1840 he became a professor of zoology at the Moscow University.

From 1842, he began to teach paleontology using material in the museum at Moscow University. In order to make the collections more useful, he began to obtain new material from the Moscow region. He found different faunas at different locations and separated the new fossils according to the ages that he assigned based on strata. He also suggested that were changes in climatic conditions at different time. He followed the work of Jean-Baptiste Lamarck and Geoffroy Saint-Hilaire, accepting the inheritance of acquired characters, but differed in postulating the idea of extinction of species. Rouillier was a good public orator and gave lectures to the general public. Because he came against scripture, he was censured by the Tsarist government. He also clashed with another geologist, Ivan Auerbach, who initially attacked Rouillier under a pseudonym. Rouillier edited the journal Vestnik estestvennykh nauk (bulletin of natural sciences) which was produced by the Moscow Society of Naturalists from the 1850s. This journal would carry one of the earliest summaries of Darwin's publication. Darwin had never heard of Rouillier or his works.

Rouillier was among the first to obtain fossils of a supposed bryozoan from the Moscow Jurassic. He however identified it as a placoderm fish and gave the name Bothriolepis jurensis Rouillier, 1847. Later, Trautschold thought it was a sea urchin and called it Rhabdocidaris remus Trautschold, 1861. Still later it was identified as a part of a fossil shark Asteracanthus granulosus by Karl Eduard von Eichwald in 1865.

== Sources ==
- "Рулье, Карл" . Brockhaus and Efron Encyclopedic Dictionary (in Russian). 1906.
