= Viktor Pisarzhevsky =

Russian lichenologist (1876–1903)

Viktor Dmitrievich Pisarzhevsky
- Виктор Дмитриевич Писаржевский
- Born: 20 [O.S. 1876] 11; Kishinev, Bessarabia Governorate, Russian Empire
- Died: 1903 (aged 26–27); Kishinev, Bessarabia Governorate, Russian Empire
- Education: Imperial Moscow University
- Known for: First published list of lichens recorded from Russia (compiled from literature up to 1897)
- Scientific career
- Fields: Lichenology

Viktor Dmitrievich Pisarzhevsky (20 November [O.S. 8 November ] 1876 – 1903) was a Russian lichenologist who also served as a notary in Bessarabia. As a student at Imperial Moscow University, he compiled and published an early literature-based checklist of lichens reported from parts of the Russian Empire, issued as "the first published list of lichens of Russia" in the late 1890s. After graduating, he returned to Kishinev and worked as a notary; his career and life ended with suicide in 1903.

== Life and career ==
=== Early life and education ===
Pisarzhevsky was born in Kishinev (present-day Chișinău, Moldova) on 8 November 1876 (O.S.) to Dmitry Ignatevich Pisarzhevsky, a notary and landowner, and Olga Ivanovna Pisarzhevskaya. He was baptized in the city in December 1876, and grew up in a family described in archival sources as hereditary nobility. He had a younger sister, Lidiya, and a younger brother, Dmitrii.

After completing the 2nd Kishinev Gymnasium in 1894, he entered the natural sciences section of the Physico-Mathematical Faculty at Imperial Moscow University. Archival records cited by later historians indicate that, by 1898, his instructors included the geologist A. P. Pavlov and the plant physiologist K. A. Timiryazev. His coursework included botany and plant anatomy and physiology, and he completed a short diploma essay on the cell that received a favourable assessment. He graduated in May 1898 with a first-degree diploma.

=== Lichenological work ===
While still a student, Pisarzhevsky published a long German-language paper in the Bulletin de la Société Impériale des Naturalistes de Moscou entitled Aufzählung der bisher in Russland aufgefundenen Flechten nach den bis zum Jahre 1897 im Druck erschienenen Angaben ("List of lichens so far found in Russia, according to printed sources up to 1897"). Synthesizing records from 24 publications, the work presented 454 lichen species in 108 genera and 22 families, arranged according to Paul Sydow's system, a taxonomic arrangement then common in Central Europe. In introductory remarks, Pisarzhevsky divided the empire into regions by perceived level of study, excluded areas he regarded as comparatively well explored (Finland, the Baltic provinces, and northern islands such as Novaya Zemlya and Vaygach), and focused his checklist on 18 less-studied regions including Moscow, Saint Petersburg, Crimea, the Caucasus, and Turkestan.

The checklist was soon criticized in print. Reviews published in 1901 argued that the work omitted major sources for lichen records in Russia, relied on an outdated classification, and repeated some taxa under different names because of synonymy and placement issues. Alexander Elenkin reviewed the work and began by noting that bibliographic syntheses can be highly useful, but only when the compiler has thorough command of the relevant literature. He argued that Pisarzhevsky did not meet that standard, stating that even a quick check suggested the paper cited only a fraction of the existing Russian literature on lichens. Elenkin also criticized the taxonomic execution of the species list. He pointed to repeated problems with synonymy and placement, including cases where the same lichen appeared more than once under different names and even under different genera, and he described the resulting catalogue as containing numerous avoidable errors. While criticized for its errors, Pisarzhevsky's 1898 checklist was cited in the bibliography of Elenkin's foundational 1906 monograph, Lichenes florae Rossiae, indicating that it was taken into account in subsequent syntheses of the Russian lichen flora. Later commentary has nevertheless treated Pisarzhevsky's paper as an early attempt to summarize the state of knowledge of Russian lichen records at the end of the 19th century. A lichen specimen in the Moscow University herbarium identified by Pisarzhevsky (Parmelia omphalodes) has also been cited as evidence that his work involved herbarium material as well as literature.

=== Later life and death ===
After university, Pisarzhevsky returned to Kishinev and entered the notarial profession. According to a later historical account based on archival documentation and contemporaneous testimony, he became implicated in the 1903 Kishinev pogrom and was removed from service during the ensuing investigation. Shortly afterwards he died by suicide, shooting himself and leaving a note; the reasons for his death were not established in the surviving record. He was buried in Kishinev at the Armenian Orthodox cemetery, where his grave has been reported as extant, though the portrait on the monument has been lost.

== Legacy ==
Pisarzhevsky's checklist has been described as largely forgotten in later Russian botanical writing, and it has been cited only rarely in the modern literature. One historian has suggested (without documentary confirmation) that this neglect may have been reinforced by the public reaction to his alleged role in the Kishinev pogrom, which rendered his name persona non grata in certain scientific circles; the same study notes that, taken together with its contemporary critical reviews, his paper remains useful for reconstructing late-19th-century knowledge of lichen records in the Russian Empire.

== Selected publications ==
- Pisarzhevsky, V. (1898). "Aufzählung der bisher in Russland aufgefundenen Flechten nach den bis zum Jahre 1897 im Druck erschienenen Angaben" [List of lichens so far found in Russia, according to printed sources up to 1897]. Bulletin de la Société Impériale des Naturalistes de Moscou. Nouvelle série (in German). 11 (3): 368–420 [368–369].
