= Anatoli Bogdanov (zoologist) =

Russian zoologist (1834–1896)

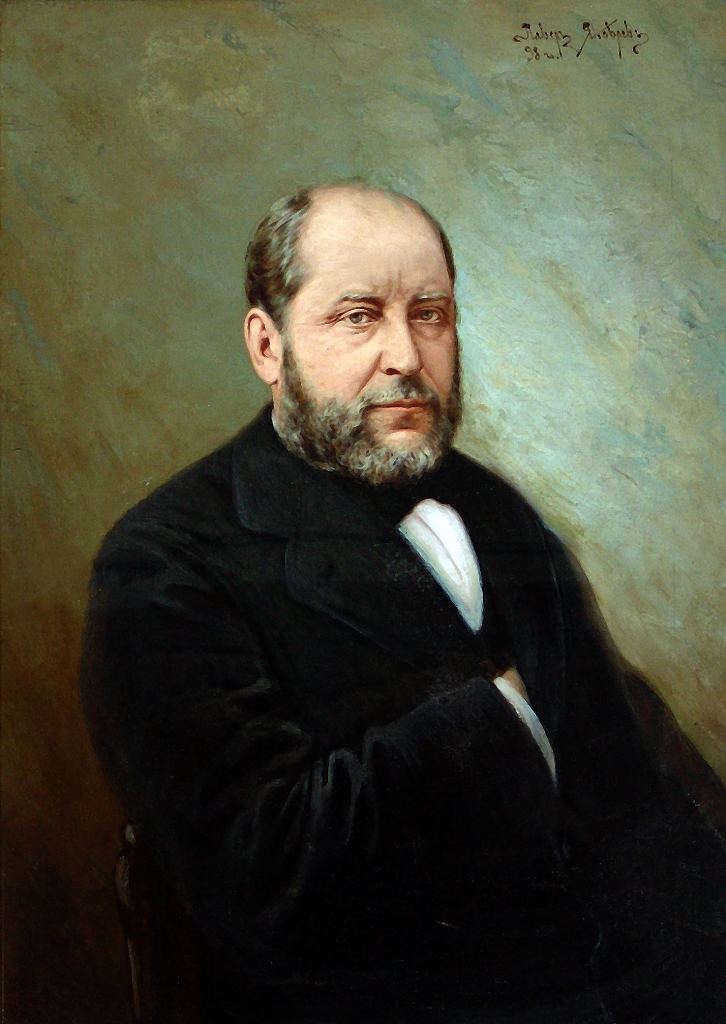
- Born: October 1, 1834
- Died: March 16, 1896 (aged 61)
- Education: Imperial Moscow University (1855); Doctor of Science (1867) Corresponding Member of the Russian Academy of Sciences
- Scientific career
- Fields: Zoology, anthropology
- Workplaces: Imperial Moscow University
- Thesis: Materials for the anthropology of the Kurgan tribe of the Moscow province

Anatoli Petrovich Bogdanov (Russian: Анатолий Петрович Богданов; 13 October 1834 – 28 March 1896) was a Russian zoologist and a pioneer of physical anthropology. He served as a professor of zoology at Moscow University. He was influential in the establishment of Moscow zoo.

== Life and work ==
Bogdanov was born in Nizhnedevitsk, Voronezh Governorate. In 1855 he graduated from the department of natural sciences at the University of Moscow, afterwards furthering his education at several natural history museums throughout Europe. During this time period he also attended lectures from prominent zoologists that included Isidore Geoffroy Saint-Hilaire (1805–1861) and Émile Blanchard (1819–1900). He was particularly impressed by the ethnological section at the great exhibition of 1851 in London. In 1858 he returned to Moscow, where he performed post-graduate work under Karl Rouillier on the colours of bird feathers. His doctoral work was in anthropology. He helped establish a department of zoology and was involved in animal introductions through the acclimatization society. In 1861 he became head of the department of zoology, later becoming director of the zoological museum at Moscow (1863), a position he maintained for the rest of his life.

Bogdanov was known for his organizational skills, and was a major factor in the founding of the zoological gardens in Moscow, as well as the establishment of a number of scientific societies, such as the Society of Devotees of Natural Science, Anthropology, and Ethnography (Russian: Императорское общество любителей естествознания, антропологии и этнографии). This society was founded in 1863 with the goal of spreading scientific knowledge to the Russian people, and creating an atmosphere where professionals and amateurs could work together in their love of natural sciences. Through this institution, Bogdanov was able to raise money and resources to create an All-Russian Ethnographic Exhibition (Russian: Всероссійская этнографическая выставка), which made its debut in April 1867. This exhibition consisted of dioramas with hundreds of mannequins representing 60 ethnic groups that populated the Russian Empire.

Bogdanov is also credited for translating several German and French textbooks on zoology and entomology into Russian. He died in Moscow and was succeeded in the zoology department by Alexander Tikhomirov.

== Bibliography ==
- Imperial Moscow University: 1755-1917: encyclopedic dictionary. Moscow: Russian political encyclopedia (ROSSPEN). 2010. pp. 82–83. ISBN 978-5-8243-1429-8 – via A. Andreev, D. Tsygankov.
