= Friedberg (surname) =

Friedberg is a German surname meaning "peace mountain". Notable people with the surname include:

- Aaron Friedberg (born 1956), American political scientist
- Abraham Shalom Friedberg (1838–1902), Russian Hebrew writer, editor, and translator
- Anne Friedberg (1952–2009), American author and historian
- Bernard Friedberg (1876–1961), Austrian Hebraist
- Billy Friedberg (1915–1965), American producer and screenwriter
- Carl Friedberg (1872–1955), German pianist and teacher
- Charles K. Friedberg (1905–1972), American cardiologist
- David Friedberg (born 1980), South African-American businessman
- Emil Albert Friedberg (1837–1910), German canonist
- Erhard Friedberg (born 1942), Austrian sociologist
- Eric Friedberg, American lawyer
- Errol Friedberg (1937–2023), American biologist and science historian
- Gertrude Friedberg (1908–1989), American playwright and author
- Heinrich von Friedberg (1813–1895), German jurist and statesman
- Hermann Friedberg (1817–1884), surgeon, forensic doctor
- Jason Friedberg (born 1971), American screenwriter and director
- John Friedberg (born 1961), American Olympic fencer
- Jon Friedberg, American poker player
- Lionel Friedberg, South African film director
- M. Paul Friedberg (1931–2025), American landscape architect
- Paul Friedberg (born 1959), American Olympic fencer
- Richard M. Friedberg (born 1935), American theoretical physicist
- Rick Friedberg (born 1944), American director, screenwriter and producer
- Simeon Adlow Friedberg (1925–2005), American physicist
