= Friedberger =

Friedberger may refer to:

== Places ==
- Friedberger Ach, a small river in Bavaria, Germany
- Friedberger Baggersee, a lake in Swabia, Bavaria, Germany

== People ==
- Ernst Friedberger (1875–1932), Jewish German immunologist
- Eleanor Friedberger (born 1976), American musician
- Matthew Friedberger (born 1972), American musician

== See also ==
- Friedberg (disambiguation)
- Friedeberg (disambiguation)
