= Vladimir Bogachev =

Russian mathematician (born 1961)

Vladimir Igorevich Bogachev (Russian: Владимир Игоревич Богачёв; born in 1961) is an eminent Russian mathematician and Full Professor of the Department of Mechanics and Mathematics of the Lomonosov Moscow State University. He is an expert in measure theory, probability theory, infinite-dimensional analysis and partial differential equations arising in mathematical physics. His research was distinguished by several awards including the medal and the prize of the Academy of Sciences of the Soviet Union (1990); Award of the Japan Society for the Promotion of Science (2000); the Doob Lecture of the Bernoulli Society (2017); and the Kolmogorov Prize of the Russian Academy of Sciences (2018).

Vladimir Bogachev is one of the most cited Russian mathematicians. He is the author of more than 200 publications and 12 monographs. His total citation index by MathSciNet is 2960, with h-index=23 (by September 2021).

== Biography ==
Bogachev graduated with honours from Moscow State University (1983). In 1986, he received his PhD (Candidate of Sciences in Russia) under the supervision of Prof. O. G. Smolyanov.

== Awards ==
- The medal and the prize of the Academy of Sciences of the Soviet Union (1990)
- Award of the Japan Society for the Promotion of Science (2000)
- The Doob Lecture of the Bernoulli Society (2017)
- The Kolmogorov Prize of the Russian Academy of Sciences (2018)

== Scientific contributions ==
In 1984, V. Bogachev resolved three Aronszajn's problems on infinite-dimensional probability distributions and answered a famous question of I. M. Gelfand posed about 25 years before that. In 1992, Vladimir Bogachev proved T. Pitcher’s conjecture (stated in 1961) on the differentiability of the distributions of diffusion processes. In 1995, he proved (with Michael Röckner) the famous Shigekawa conjecture on the absolute continuity of invariant measures of diffusion processes. In 1999, in a joint work with Sergio Albeverio and Röckner, Professor Bogachev resolved the well-known problem of S. R. S. Varadhan on the uniqueness of stationary distributions, which had remained open for about 20 years.

A remarkable achievement of Vladimir Bogachev is the recently obtained (2021) answer to the question of Andrey Kolmogorov (posed in 1931) on the uniqueness of the solution to the Cauchy problem: it is shown that the Cauchy problem with a unit diffusion coefficient and locally bounded drift has a unique probabilistic solution on $\R^1$, and in $\R^{>1}$ this is not true even for smooth drift.

== Main Publications ==
=== Papers ===
- Bogachev V.I., Röckner M. Regularity of invariant measures on finite and infinite dimensional spaces and applications. J. Funct. Anal., V. 133, N 1, P. 168–223 (1995)
- Albeverio S., Bogachev V.I., Röckner M. On uniqueness of invariant measures for finite and infinite dimensional diffusions. Comm. Pure Appl. Math., V. 52, P. 325–362 (1999)
- Bogachev V.I., Krasovitskii T.I., Shaposhnikov S.V. On uniqueness of probability solutions of the Fokker–Planck–Kolmogorov equation, Sb. Math., V. 212, N 6, P. 745–781 (2021)

=== Books ===
- Bogachev V.I. Gaussian measures. American Mathematical Society, Rhode Island, 1998
- Bogachev V.I. Measure theory. V. 1,2. Springer-Verlag, Berlin, 2007
- Bogachev V.I. Weak convergence of measures, American Mathematical Society, Rhode Island, 2018.
