= Bartholdi =

Bartholdi is a surname. Notable people with the surname include:

- Frédéric Auguste Bartholdi (1834–1904), French sculptor best known for the Statue of Liberty
- Laurent Bartholdi (born 1973), Swiss mathematician
- Joe Bartholdi Jr. (born 1980), American poker player

== See also ==
- Bartholdy
