= Alexei Semenov =

Alexei Semenov may refer to:

- Alexei Semenov (mathematician) (born 1950) is a Russian mathematician
- Alexei Semenov (ice hockey) (born 1981) is a Russian former professional ice hockey defenceman
