= Friedberg =

Friedberg may refer to:

== Places ==
- Friedberg, Bavaria, Germany
- Friedberg, Hesse, Germany
- Aichach-Friedberg, Bavaria, Germany
- Friedberg, Bad Saulgau, a district of Bad Saulgau, Baden-Württemberg, Germany
- Friedberg, Styria, Austria
- Friedberg, German name of Frymburk, Czech Republic

== Other uses ==
- Friedberg (surname)

== See also ==
- Fried (surname)
- Friedeberg
- Friedberger (disambiguation)
