= IMG =

img or IMG is an abbreviation for image.

img or IMG may also refer to:

== Science, technology, and mathematics ==
- IMG (file format), file that stores a complete and uncompressed copy of the contents of a storage device
- IMG, a prefix for camera image file names commonly used in Design rule for Camera File system
- [img], a tag used in BBCode to place an image
- <img>, an HTML element used to place an image; see HTML element § Images and objects
- Integrated Microbial Genomes System, a framework for comparative analysis of the genomes sequenced by the Joint Genome Institute
- International medical graduate, a physician who has graduated from a medical school outside of the country in which he or she intends to practice
- Iterated monodromy group, a concept in mathematics related to symbolic dynamics

== Companies and groups ==
- IMG (company), global sports and media business headquartered in New York City but with its main offices in Cleveland, originally known as the "International Management Group"
- IMG College, a subsidiary of the IMG company that operates as a college sports marketing agency, based in Winston-Salem, North Carolina
- IMG Academy, an athletic training complex in Bradenton, Florida with facilities for multiple sports
- IMG Artists, a performing arts management company with multiple worldwide offices
- IMG Worlds of Adventure, an indoor amusement park located in Dubai, United Arab Emirates
- Imagination Technologies, a semiconductor IP company (also known as IMG)
- Inside Mac Games, a game news site for the Macintosh
- International Marxist Group, a Trotskyist group in Britain between 1968 and 1982
- International Medical Group (Uganda), a conglomerate of health-related businesses headquartered in Kampala, Uganda
