= Rostislav Grigorchuk =

Ukrainian mathematician

Rostislav Ivanovich Grigorchuk
- Born: February 23, 1953 (age 73); Vyshnivets, Ternopil Oblast, USSR
- Education: Lomonosov Moscow State University
- Known for: researcher in geometric group theory, discovering the Grigorchuk group
- Awards: Award of Moscow Mathematical Society (1979), Bogolyubov Prize of National Academy of Sciences of Ukraine (2015), Leroy P. Steele Prize (2015), Humboldt Research Award by Germany’s Alexander von Humboldt Foundation (2020)
- Scientific career
- Fields: Mathematics
- Workplaces: Texas A&M University

Rostislav Ivanovich Grigorchuk (Russian: Ростислав Иванович Григорчук; Ukrainian: Ростисла́в Iва́нович Григорчу́к; b. February 23, 1953) is a mathematician working in different areas of mathematics including group theory, dynamical systems, geometry and computer science. He holds the rank of Distinguished Professor in the Mathematics Department of Texas A&M University. Grigorchuk is particularly well known for having constructed, in a 1984 paper, the first example of a finitely generated group of intermediate growth, thus answering an important problem posed by John Milnor in 1968. This group is now known as the Grigorchuk group and it is one of the important objects studied in geometric group theory, particularly in the study of branch groups, automaton groups and iterated monodromy groups. Grigorchuk is one of the pioneers of asymptotic group theory as well as of the theory of dynamically defined groups. He introduced the notion of branch groups and developed the foundations of the related theory. Grigorchuk, together with his collaborators and students, initiated the theory of groups generated by finite Mealy type automata, interpreted them as groups of fractal type, developed the theory of groups acting on rooted trees, and found numerous applications of these groups in various fields of mathematics including functional analysis, topology, spectral graph theory, dynamical systems and ergodic theory.

== Biographical data ==
Grigorchuk was born on February 23, 1953, in Ternopil Oblast, now Ukraine (in 1953 part of the USSR). He received his undergraduate degree in 1975 from Moscow State University. He obtained a PhD (Candidate of Science) in Mathematics in 1978, also from Moscow State University, where his thesis advisor was Anatoly M. Stepin. Grigorchuk received a habilitation (Doctor of Science) degree in Mathematics in 1985 at the Steklov Institute of Mathematics in Moscow. During the 1980s and 1990s, Rostislav Grigorchuk held positions at the Moscow State University of Transportation, and subsequently at the Steklov Institute of Mathematics and Moscow State University. In 2002 Grigorchuk joined the faculty of Texas A&M University as a Professor of Mathematics, and he was promoted to the rank of Distinguished Professor in 2008.

Rostislav Grigorchuk gave an invited address at the 1990 International Congress of Mathematicians in Kyoto an AMS Invited Address at the March 2004 meeting of the American Mathematical Society in Athens, Ohio and a plenary talk at the 2004 Winter Meeting of the Canadian Mathematical Society.

Grigorchuk is the Editor-in-Chief of the journal "Groups, Geometry and Dynamics", published by the European Mathematical Society, and is or was a member of the editorial boards of the journals "Mathematical Notes", "International Journal of Algebra and Computation", "Journal of Modern Dynamics", "Geometriae Dedicata", "Ukrainian Mathematical Journal", "Algebra and Discrete Mathematics", "Carpathian Mathematical Publications", "Bukovinian Mathematical Journal", and "Matematychni Studii".

== Mathematical contributions ==
Grigorchuk is most well known for having constructed the first example of a finitely generated group of intermediate growth which now bears his name and is called the Grigorchuk group (sometimes it is also called the first Grigorchuk group since Grigorchuk constructed several other groups that are also commonly studied). This group has growth that is faster than polynomial but slower than exponential. Grigorchuk constructed this group in a 1980 paper and proved that it has intermediate growth in a 1984 article. This result answered a long-standing open problem posed by John Milnor in 1968 about the existence of finitely generated groups of intermediate growth. Grigorchuk's group has a number of other remarkable mathematical properties. It is a finitely generated infinite residually finite 2-group (that is, every element of the group has a finite order which is a power of 2). It is also the first example of a finitely generated group that is amenable but not elementary amenable, thus providing an answer to another long-standing problem, posed by Mahlon Day in 1957. Also Grigorchuk's group is "just infinite": that is, it is infinite but every proper quotient of this group is finite.

Grigorchuk's group is a central object in the study of the so-called branch groups and automata groups. These are finitely generated groups of automorphisms of rooted trees that are given by particularly nice recursive descriptions and that have remarkable self-similar properties. The study of branch, automata and self-similar groups has been particularly active in the 1990s and 2000s and a number of unexpected connections with other areas of mathematics have been discovered there, including dynamical systems, differential geometry, Galois theory, ergodic theory, random walks, fractals, Hecke algebras, bounded cohomology, functional analysis, and others. In particular, many of these self-similar groups arise as iterated monodromy groups of complex polynomials. Important connections have been discovered between the algebraic structure of self-similar groups and the dynamical properties of the polynomials in question, including encoding their Julia sets.

Much of Grigorchuk's work in the 1990s and 2000s has been on developing the theory of branch, automata and self-similar groups and on exploring these connections. For example, Grigorchuk, with co-authors, obtained a counter-example to the conjecture of Michael Atiyah about L^{2}-betti numbers of closed manifolds.

Grigorchuk is also known for his contributions to the general theory of random walks on groups and the theory of amenable groups, particularly for obtaining in 1980 what is commonly known (see for example) as Grigorchuk's co-growth criterion of amenability for finitely generated groups.

== Awards and honors ==
In 1979 Rostislav Grigorchuk was awarded the Moscow Mathematical Society.

In 1991 he obtained Fulbright Senior Scholarship, Columbia University, New York.

In 2003 an international group theory conference in honor of Grigorchuk's 50th birthday was held in Gaeta, Italy. Special anniversary issues of the "International Journal of Algebra and Computation", the journal "Algebra and Discrete Mathematics" and the book "Infinite Groups: Geometric, Combinatorial and Dynamical Aspects" were dedicated to Grigorchuk's 50th birthday.

In 2009 Grigorchuk R.I. was awarded the Association of Former Students Distinguished Achievement in Research, Texas A&M University.

In 2012 he became a fellow of the American Mathematical Society.

In 2015 Rostislav Grigorchuk was awarded the AMS Leroy P. Steele Prize for Seminal Contribution to Research.

In 2020 Grigorchuk R.I. received the Humboldt Research Award by Germany’s Alexander von Humboldt Foundation.

== See also ==
- Geometric group theory
- Growth of groups
- Iterated monodromy group
- Amenable groups
- Grigorchuk group
