= Aleksandr Borovkov =

Russian mathematician (1931–2026)

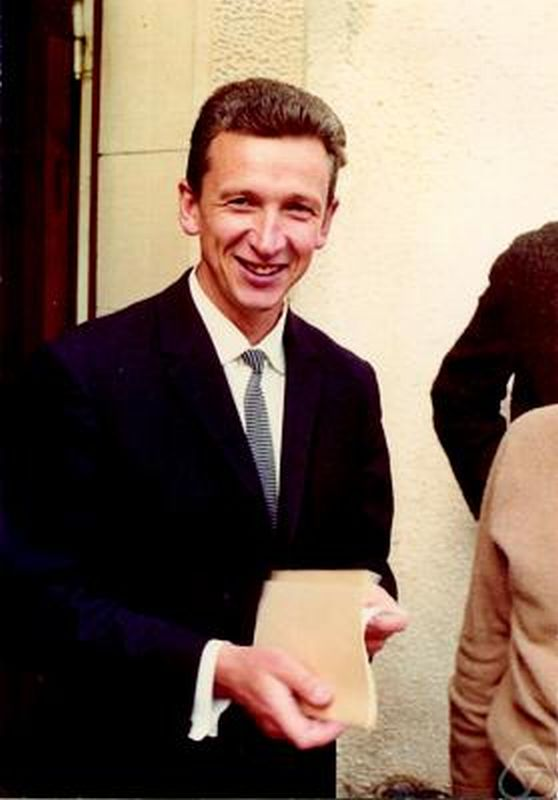
Borovkov, Oberwolfach 1968, photographed by Konrad Jacobs

Aleksandr Alekseevich Borovkov (Russian: Александр Алексеевич Боровков; 6 March 1931 – 15 May 2026) was a Russian mathematician.

== Life and career ==
Borovkov was born in Moscow on 6 March 1931. He received his Russian candidate degree (Ph.D.) in 1959 under Andrey Kolmogorov at Moscow State University and his Russian doctorate (higher doctoral degree) in 1963. He was an academician at the Sobolev Institute of Mathematics of the Siberian Branch of the Russian Academy of Sciences and a professor at the Novosibirsk State University.

Borovkov was one of the leading representatives of the Siberian school of probability theory founded by Kolmogorov and developed in Novosibirsk. His research spanned probability theory, mathematical statistics, stochastic processes, queueing theory, large deviations, random walks, and asymptotic methods. He authored several influential monographs that became standard references in probability theory and stochastic modelling and trained numerous researchers in the field.

His work contributed to the mathematical foundations of queueing systems, asymptotic analysis of stochastic processes, and the theory of large deviations. Through his research, teaching, and textbooks, Borovkov played a significant role in the development of probability theory in the Soviet Union and Russia during the second half of the twentieth century.

His son, Konstantin Borovkov, is a mathematician specializing in probability theory and stochastic processes and has held academic appointments at the University of Melbourne. The two collaborated on research, including the monograph Asymptotic Analysis of Random Walks (2008).

He was an Invited Speaker of the ICM in 1966 in Moscow and in 1978 in Helsinki (Rate of convergence and large deviations in invariance principle).

Borovkov was elected in 1966 a corresponding member and in 1990 a full member of the Russian Academy of Sciences. In 1979 he received the USSR State Prize. He was also awarded the Kolmogorov Prize in 2015.

Borovkov died on 15 May 2026, at the age of 95.

== Scientific legacy ==
Borovkov made significant contributions to modern probability theory, particularly in the study of stochastic processes, queueing systems, asymptotic methods, and large deviation theory. His research helped establish rigorous mathematical foundations for the analysis of complex random systems arising in telecommunications, operations research, statistical physics, and applied probability.

As a member of the Novosibirsk mathematical school associated with Andrey Kolmogorov, Borovkov played a central role in the development of probability theory in the Soviet Union and later Russia. His monographs, including Probability Theory, Mathematical Statistics, and Stochastic Processes in Queueing Theory, were widely used by researchers and graduate students and were translated into several languages.

Through his work at the Sobolev Institute of Mathematics and Novosibirsk State University, Borovkov supervised numerous doctoral students and contributed to the training of several generations of probabilists. His influence extended internationally through collaborations, invited lectures, and widely cited publications in probability theory and mathematical statistics.

Borovkov's contributions were recognized through his election to the Russian Academy of Sciences, the award of the USSR State Prize, and the Kolmogorov Prize, one of Russia's highest distinctions in mathematics.

== Students and collaborators ==
Throughout his career, Borovkov supervised and mentored numerous graduate students and researchers in probability theory, mathematical statistics, and stochastic processes. As a leading figure at the Sobolev Institute of Mathematics and Novosibirsk State University, he contributed to the growth of the Novosibirsk school of probability theory and helped establish it as an internationally recognized centre for research in stochastic analysis.

Borovkov maintained collaborations with mathematicians in Russia, Europe, North America, and Australia. His joint work with colleagues and former students covered a wide range of topics, including queueing theory, large deviations, random walks, and asymptotic methods. Among his notable collaborators was his son, Konstantin Borovkov, with whom he co-authored the monograph Asymptotic Analysis of Random Walks (2008), a contribution to the Encyclopedia of Mathematics and Its Applications series published by Cambridge University Press.

His influence continues through the work of researchers trained in the probabilistic traditions associated with the Novosibirsk mathematical school.

== Selected works ==
Borovkov authored several influential monographs and research papers in probability theory, stochastic processes, and applied probability. His books have been widely used as reference texts in graduate-level probability and statistics.

=== Books ===
- Borovkov, A. A. (1976). Stochastic Processes in Queueing Theory. Springer.
- Borovkov, A. A. (1984). Asymptotic Methods in Queueing Theory. Wiley.
- Borovkov, A. A. (1998). Probability Theory. Gordon & Breach.
- Borovkov, A. A. (1998). Mathematical Statistics. Gordon & Breach.
- Borovkov, A. A. (1998). Ergodicity and Stability of Stochastic Processes. Wiley.
- Borovkov, A. A.; Mogulskii, A. A. (1992–1993). “Large Deviations and Testing Statistical Hypotheses”. Siberian Advances in Mathematics.
- Borovkov, A. A.; Borovkov, K. A. (2008). Asymptotic Analysis of Random Walks. Cambridge University Press.

=== Influential topics ===
His research papers span a broad range of topics in applied and theoretical probability, including:

- Large deviation principles for stochastic processes
- Asymptotic behavior of random walks
- Queueing systems and heavy traffic approximations
- Ergodicity and stability of stochastic systems
- Limit theorems in probability theory

These works are frequently cited in the literature on stochastic processes, queueing theory, and asymptotic probability.

== Awards and honours ==
Borovkov received several major awards and honours in recognition of his contributions to probability theory and mathematical statistics.

He was elected a corresponding member of the Academy of Sciences of the USSR in 1966 and became a full member of the Russian Academy of Sciences in 1990. These elections reflect his long-standing role in Soviet and Russian mathematical research institutions.

In 1979, he was awarded the USSR State Prize for his contributions to probability theory and stochastic processes. This was one of the highest scientific honours in the Soviet Union.

In 2015, Borovkov received the Kolmogorov Prize, awarded for outstanding contributions in probability theory and related fields.

He was also an Invited Speaker at the International Congress of Mathematicians in Moscow (1966) and Helsinki (1978), an honour reserved for mathematicians with internationally recognised contributions to their field.

== Death and legacy ==
Borovkov died on 15 May 2026 at the age of 95.

Following his death, he was remembered within the mathematical community for his contributions to probability theory, particularly in queueing theory, stochastic processes, and asymptotic methods. His work continues to be cited in research on random processes and applied probability, and his monographs remain in use as reference texts in graduate education.

His academic lineage, originating from the Moscow school of probability theory associated with Andrey Kolmogorov, and continuing through his own students and collaborators, forms part of the broader development of probability theory in the 20th and 21st centuries.

== See also ==
- Konstantin Borovkov

== Selected publications ==
- Stochastic processes in queueing theory. Springer, 1976
- Asymptotic methods in queuing theory. Wiley, 1984.
- Probability Theory. New York: Gordon & Breach, 1998
- Mathematical Statistics. New York: Gordon & Breach, 1998
- Ergodicity and stability of stochastic processes. New York: Wiley, 1998.
- with A. A. Mogulskii: Large deviations and testing statistical hypothesis, Siber. Adv. Math., 1992, 1993
- with Konstantin A. Borovkov: Asymptotic analysis of random walks. Series: Encyclopedia of Mathematics and Its Applications, Vol. 118. Cambridge University Press, 2008.
