= Tropheops macrophthalmus =

Conservation status
- Least Concern (IUCN 3.1)

Scientific classification
- Kingdom: Animalia
- Phylum: Chordata
- Class: Actinopterygii
- Order: Cichliformes
- Family: Cichlidae
- Genus: Tropheops
- Species: T. macrophthalmus

Binomial name
- Tropheops macrophthalmus (C. G. E. Ahl, 1926)

Synonyms
- Pseudotropheus macrophthalmus C. G. E. Ahl, 1926; Pseudotropheus tropheops macrophthalmus C. G. E. Ahl, 1926

Species of fish

Tropheops macrophthalmus is a species of cichlid endemic to Lake Malawi. This species can reach a length of 11.5 centimetres (4.5 in) TL. It can also be found in the aquarium trade.
