= Tropheops modestus =

Conservation status
- Near Threatened (IUCN 3.1)

Scientific classification
- Kingdom: Animalia
- Phylum: Chordata
- Class: Actinopterygii
- Order: Cichliformes
- Family: Cichlidae
- Genus: Tropheops
- Species: T. modestus

Binomial name
- Tropheops modestus (D. S. Johnson, 1974)

Synonyms
- Pseudotropheus modestus D. S. Johnson, 1974

Species of fish

Tropheops modestus is a species of cichlid endemic to Lake Malawi.

This species can reach a length of 6.4 centimetres (2.5 in) SL.
