= Alexei Semenov (mathematician) =

Russian mathematician

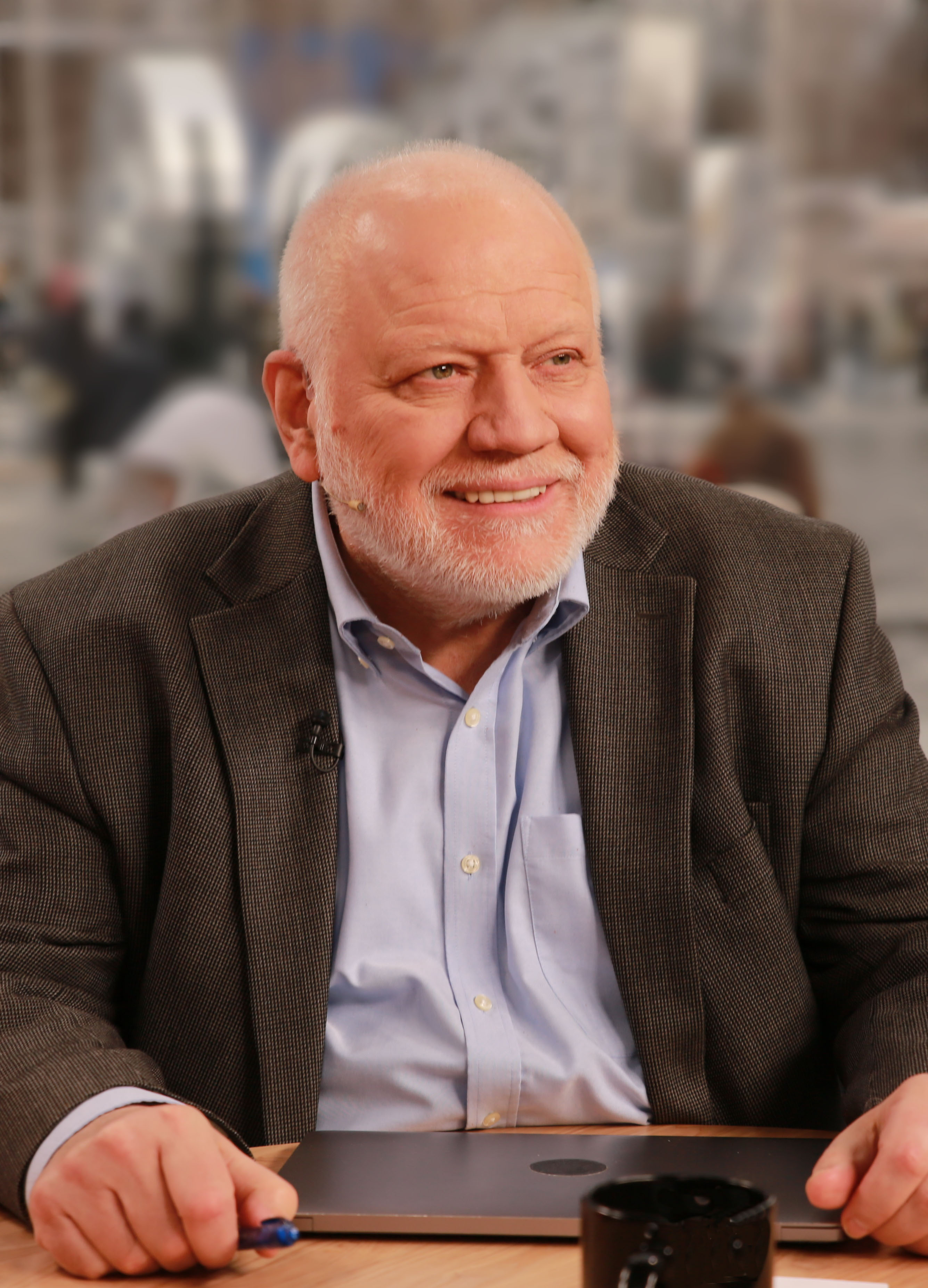
- Born: October 13, 1950 (age 76); Moscow, USSR
- Citizenship: Soviet Union; Russia
- Education: Full Member RAS (2011)
- Alma mater: Moscow State University (1972)
- Awards: Prize of the President of RF (1997)
- Scientific career
- Fields: Mathematical logic
- Workplaces: Lomonosov Moscow State University; Axel Berg Institute of Cybernetics and Educational Computing; FRC CSC RAS; Moscow State Pedagogical University; Institute of Education, HSE University; Moscow Institute of Physics and Technology; Herzen University; Moscow City University
- Doctoral advisor: Albert Muchnik
- Doctoral students: Andrey Muchnik, Vladimir Vovk

Alexei (also Aleksei, Alexey, Aleksey) L. Semenov (also Semyonov, Semёnov) (Russian: Алексей Львович Семенов; born 1950) is a Russian mathematician, educationalist, Academician of the Russian Academy of Sciences, Academician of the Russian Academy of Education, Head of the Department of Mathematical Logic and Theory of Algorithms at Lomonosov State University, Professor, and Dr. Sc.

== Early life and education ==
Alexei Semenov was born in Moscow to a family of electronic and computer engineers. He graduated from the Moscow State University Faculty of Mechanics and Mathematics of Lomonosov in 1972. There, he completed a Candidate of Sciences degree in physics and mathematics under scientific advisor Albert Muchnik, graduating in 1975. His dissertation was titled, "On definability in some decidable theories". He also received a Doctor of Sciences in Physics and Mathematics from Steklov Institute of Mathematics in 1984, with his dissertation titled "Logical Theories of One-place Functions on Integers".

== Career and research ==
Semenov conducted research in the field of mathematical logic, cybernetics, theoretical computer science, artificial intelligence, and education.

=== Mathematics ===
Semenov worked largely in definability theory. He is well known for his decidability results, Cobham–Semenov Theorem, symbolic dynamics applications, and lattices of definability descriptions. His student Andrey Muchnik solved Michael O. Rabin's problem, posed at the International Congress of Mathematicians in Nice. Muchnik and Semenov solved a problem of Andrey Kolmogorov from his work originated descriptive complexity theory. He also contributed to the foundations of the theory of algorithms and theory of randomness.

=== Computing and AI ===
Semenov started work in practical computing at age 14 in cooperation with his mother, namely in speech recognition in the group of Dmitry Pospelov. He participated in the last Soviet attempt to construct a supercomputer in 1986. During his later years, he developed the concept of an individual augmented by digital instruments and media. The concept furthers the visions of Lev Vygotsky, Josef M. Feigenberg, Sherry Turkle, Andy Clark and Michel Serres about education and mass schooling.

=== Education ===
Semenov's theoretical and practical work in education originated in his involvement as a student, and later, as a teacher in the Nikolay Konstantinov’s math schools. His educational philosophy is rooted in the “learning-by-doing” method of Robert Lee Moore, Paul Halmos, and Russian mathematical circles constructionist approach of Seymour Papert.

Semenov's approach to learning and teaching math and computer science in primary school is based on Inquiry-based learning, mathematical experimenting by learners, language development, emphasizing visual (on screen and paper) and palpable (manipulatives, moving objects) environments of strings, bags, tables, games, and robots as the basis for all math. This includes, but is not limited by, numerical (arithmetic), priority of solving problems-not-known-how-to-solve over drill-and-practice, and using computer for all routine tasks.

In 1985, he was the organizer and co-author of the first computer science textbook for all Soviet schools (editor and co-author – academician A. P. Ershov). Later he was the leader of the authors' teams for textbooks in mathematics and computer science for primary and secondary schools.

In 1987, following his work in the Academy of Sciences, he originated a not-for-profit Institute of New Technologies (INT) that introduced the constructionist philosophy into Russian schools and started cooperation of INT and other Russian educators with Papert's group at MIT Media Lab, Blagovest Sendov's Problem Group on Education at Bulgarian Academy of Sciences, Robert Tinker's group at TERC, LCSI, Key Curriculum Press. So INT produced Russian adaptations, learning and teaching materials for Logo, educational LEGO, Geometer's Sketchpad, etc.

Semenov initiated and led in cooperation with Sergey Soprunov the project of Logo-style learning environment for pre-literacy pre-numeracy children, recognized by S. Papert in his book "The Connected Family".

In 2017–2019, he led design and implementation for a system of resultative education (personalized competence-based learning) for Russian schools.

In 2019, Semenov organized a 3-year Program «Fundamental Scientific Support for the Digitalization of General Education» in Russian Foundation for Fundamental Research. As a result of the expert selection, 62 teams from 12 regions of Russia received financial support. "Charter for the Digital Way of School" (2021) is one of the outcomes created as part of the work on the program as a result of a dialogue between the participants of the Program and other prominent figures of Russian education.

== Teaching positions ==
He taught at the Moscow school No. 7, Andrey Kolmogorov boarding school at Lomonosov Moscow State University, and at the Department of Mathematical Logic Faculty of Mechanics and Mathematics at Lomonosov Moscow State University.

He was the president and CEO (rector) of the Moscow Institute of Open Education (1993–2013), which was responsible for the professional development, in-service training, guidance and consulting of all 100,000 Moscow teachers. In 2002 he recreated School No. 179 and returned the mathematician and teacher Nikolay Konstantinov to work there.

He was the president and CEO (rector) of the Moscow State Pedagogical University (2013–2016).

He is the director of Axel Berg Institute of Cybernetics and Educational Computing FRC CSC Russian Academy of Sciences since 2015.

He was the editor-in-chief of the Kvant magazine (2012–2018). He was also the editor-in-chief of the journal Doklady Mathematics (from 2021). He served as invited editor to volumes of Theoretical Computer Science and MDPI – Mathematics (2022, 2023). He is the author of over 200 scientific papers in mathematics, computer science and education.

== International activities ==
Semenov's vision was supported and disseminated by UNESCO with the help of recommendations for primary education as well as for general education. Later, he participated in the teams led by Ivan Kalaš that created recommendations for preschool education and primary education. He participated in the creation of UNESCO recommendations on ICT for teacher education. Professor Alexei Semenov's activities and influence were later recognized by UNESCO Prize on ICT in Education.

Semenov was the national coordinator of Second Information Technology in Education Study: SITES 2006.

In 1989, he initiated and played a critical role in the return of international organization on technologies in education ORT (originated in St. Petersburg in 1880) into USSR and Central Europe, where he served as a member of Board of Trustees and co-chair of Academic Advisory Council of the organization.

In 2007–2009, he served as a member of the executive committee of the International Commission on Mathematical Instruction.

== Awards and honours ==
- UNESCO – King Hamad Bin Isa Al-Khalifa Prize in 2009 – for the application of information and communication technologies in education.
- Kolmogorov Prize in 2006 – for outstanding achievements in the field of mathematics for the series of works «On the refinement of A.N. Kolmogorov, related to the theory of chance». He won this award alongside mathematician Andrey Muchnik.
- The president of the Russian Federation Award in the field of education in 1998 – headed the team for the development and implementation of a comprehensive program for informatization of education in the Moscow region.
- Russian Federation Government Prize in the field of education in 2009 – for the development of the project «Informatization of the education system of the Russian Federation». The prize was awarded by the order of the Government of the Russian Federation of 28.08.2009 No. 1246-r.

== Personal life ==
His wife is E. I. Bulin–Sokolova, a graduate of the Moscow State University, an educator, and a doctor of pedagogical Sciences. With Galina Sheina he has eight children.
