= Laurent Bartholdi =

Swiss mathematician

Laurent Bartholdi is a Swiss mathematician working in the areas of geometric group theory, symbolic dynamics, and computational complexity. He is particularly well-known for his contributions to the study of self-similar groups and amenability of groups. Currently Bartholdi is a CNRS Directeur de Recherche at Institut Camille Jordan, Claude Bernard University Lyon 1 in France.

Bartholdi received a PhD in Mathematics in 2000 from the University of Geneva, with Pierre de la Harpe and Rostislav Grigorchuk as co-advisors.

In June 2025 Bartholdi delivered the inaugural Paul Schupp Distinguished Lecture at the GAGTA 2025 "Groups, Logic and Computation" conference at the Stevens Institute of Technology.

== Selected works ==
- Laurent Bartholdi; Balint Virág (2005). "Amenability via random walks". Duke Mathematical Journal. 130 (1): 39–56. arXiv:math/0305262. doi:10.1215/S0012-7094-05-13012-5. MR 2176547.
- Laurent Bartholdi (2010). "Gardens of Eden and amenability on cellular automata". Journal of the European Mathematical Society. 12 (1): 241–248. doi:10.4171/JEMS/196. MR 2578610.
- Laurent Bartholdi; Anna Erschler (2012). "Growth of permutational extensions". Inventiones Mathematicae. 189 (2): 431–455. arXiv:1011.5266. doi:10.1007/s00222-011-0368-x. MR 2947548.
- Laurent Bartholdi; Dzmitry Dudko (2021). "Algorithmic aspects of branched coverings II/V: sphere bisets and decidability of Thurston equivalence". Inventiones Mathematicae. 223 (3): 895–994. doi:10.1007/s00222-020-00995-2. MR 4213769.
