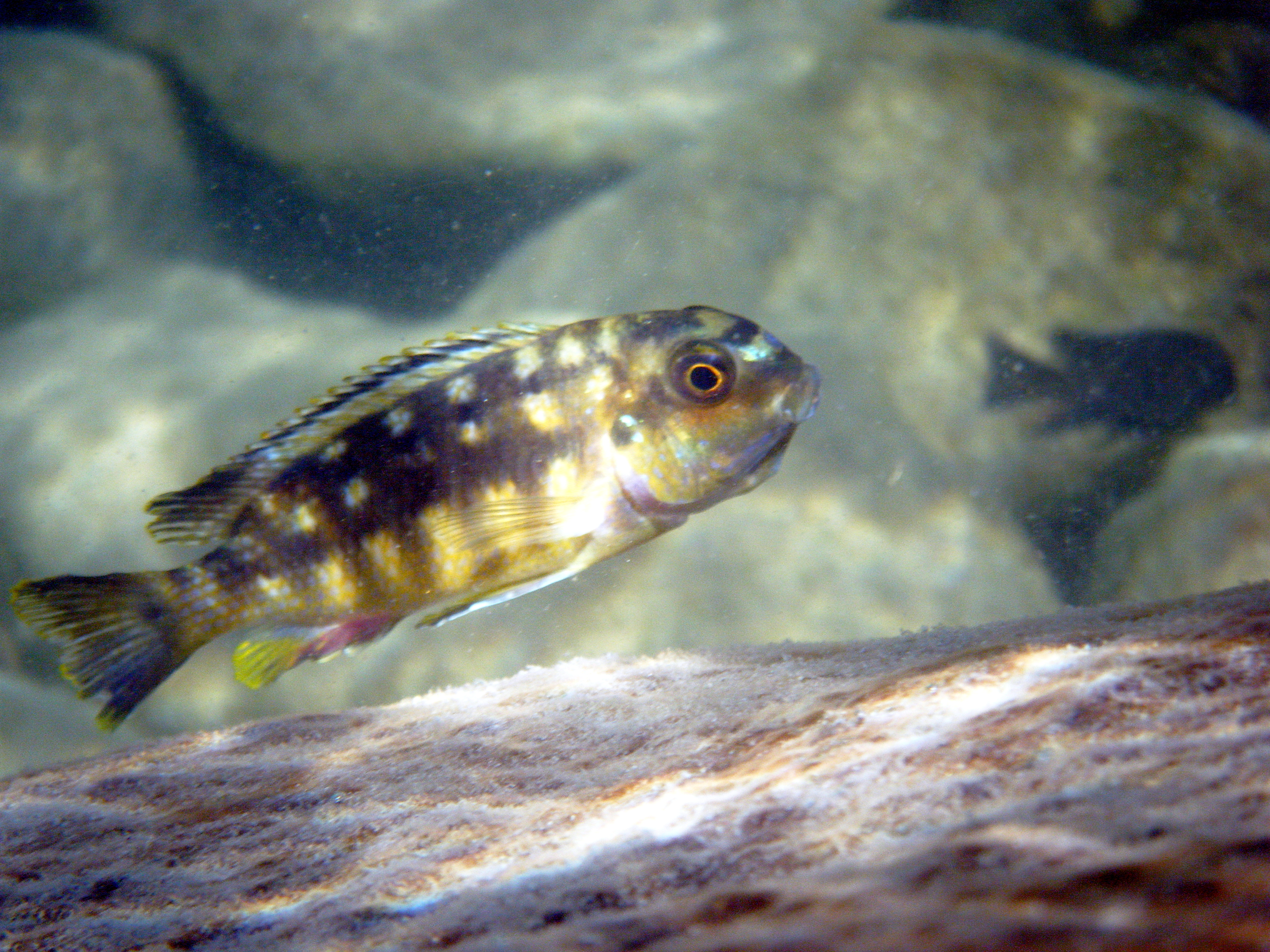
- Tropheops spp. mouth brooding female, Thumbi West Island

Scientific classification
- Kingdom: Animalia
- Phylum: Chordata
- Class: Actinopterygii
- Order: Cichliformes
- Family: Cichlidae
- Tribe: Haplochromini
- Genus: Tropheops; Trewavas, 1984

Type species
- Pseudotropheus tropheops Regan, 1922

= Tropheops =

Genus of fishes

Tropheops is a genus of cichlids endemic to Lake Malawi.

== Species ==
There are currently 10 recognized species in this genus:

- Tropheops biriwira Li, Konings & Stauffer, 2016
- Tropheops gracilior (Trewavas, 1935)
- Tropheops kamtambo Li, Konings & Stauffer, 2016
- Tropheops kumwera Li, Konings & Stauffer, 2016
- Tropheops lucerna Trewavas, 1935
- Tropheops macrophthalmus (C. G. E. Ahl, 1926)
- Tropheops microstoma (Trewavas, 1935)
- Tropheops modestus (D. S. Johnson, 1974)
- Tropheops novemfasciatus (Regan, 1922)
- Tropheops romandi (Colombé, 1979)
- Tropheops tropheops (Regan, 1922)
