= Tropheops microstoma =

Conservation status
- Near Threatened (IUCN 3.1)

Scientific classification
- Kingdom: Animalia
- Phylum: Chordata
- Class: Actinopterygii
- Order: Cichliformes
- Family: Cichlidae
- Genus: Tropheops
- Species: T. microstoma

Binomial name
- Tropheops microstoma (Trewavas, 1935)

Synonyms
- Pseudotropheus microstoma Trewavas, 1935; Pseudotropheus tropheops microstoma Trewavas, 1935

Species of fish

Tropheops microstoma is a species of cichlid fish endemic to Lake Malawi where it prefers sheltered bays with calm waters. This species can reach a length of 9.8 centimetres (3.9 in) SL. It can also be found in the aquarium trade.
