= Tropheops lucerna =

Conservation status
- Least Concern (IUCN 3.1)

Scientific classification
- Kingdom: Animalia
- Phylum: Chordata
- Class: Actinopterygii
- Order: Cichliformes
- Family: Cichlidae
- Genus: Tropheops
- Species: T. lucerna

Binomial name
- Tropheops lucerna Trewavas, 1935

Synonyms
- Pseudotropheus lucerna Trewavas, 1935

Species of fish

Tropheops lucerna is a species of cichlid endemic to Lake Malawi where it is found at depths of 2 to 4 metres (6.6 to 13.1 ft) in beds of Vallisneria in bays. This species can reach a length of 13.5 centimetres (5.3 in) TL. It can also be found in the aquarium trade. It feeds by brushing loose strands of algae off of rocks, sand and the leaves of macrophytes.
