= Richard M. Friedberg =

Richard Friedberg
- Born: 8 October 1935 (age 90); New York City, New York, U.S.
- Education: Harvard University
- Awards: William Lowell Putnam Mathematical Competition (1956); IEEE Evolutionary Computation Pioneer Award (2004)
- Scientific career
- Fields: Physicist
- Workplaces: Barnard College; Columbia University
- Doctoral advisor: Tsung-Dao Lee

Richard M. Friedberg (born October 8, 1935) is a theoretical physicist who has contributed to a wide variety of problems in mathematics and physics. These include mathematical logic, number theory, solid state physics, general relativity, particle physics, quantum optics, genome research, and the foundations of quantum physics.

He has been recognized as a pioneer in machine learning since he wrote on "A learning machine" in 1958. IEEE Neural Networks Society awarded him in 2004, commenting

Today. Friedberg’s initial words from 1958 “Machines would be more useful if they could learn to perform tasks for which they were not given precise methods” are the coin of the realm in computational intelligence. Entire disciplines of evolutionary computation are devoted to problems in automatic programming. Friedberg’s early work truly was a seminal contribution.

== Early life ==
Friedberg was born in Manhattan on Oct 8, 1935, the child of cardiologist Charles K. Friedberg, and playwright Gertrude Tonkonogy.

Friedberg studied at Harvard University for his bachelor's degree. He finished the William Lowell Putnam Mathematical Competition in 1956 in the top five competitors.

In 1962 obtained a Ph.D. at Columbia University.

== Academic work ==
Friedberg solved a theoretical problem in recursion theory called Post's problem. In computability theory there is the decision problem of whether a given number is in a given set. Turing degree is a measure of the computational challenge. In 1944 Emil Post asked whether intermediate degrees exist on a certain interval of the Turing scale. Albert Muchnik (1956) and Friedberg (1957) proved the Friedberg–Muchnik theorem as the solution.

In 1968 Friedberg wrote an informal book on number theory titled An Adventurer's Guide to Number Theory. In the book, he states, "The difference between the theory of numbers and arithmetic is like the difference between poetry and grammar."

Friedberg has investigated the issue of genome instability by developing a method of comparing genomes and establishing an edit distance between them. The genome variability was modeled with the Double Cut and Join Model. The chromosomal rearrangements may be block exchanges, translocation, or inversions. Friedberg has contributed to the task of efficiently sorting such permutations.

An 1840 work by Olinde Rodrigues has been reviewed by Friedberg who translated the work, provided modern vector notation, diagrams, and annotation of the text.

== Selected publications ==
- 1957: (communicated by Kurt Gödel) "Two Recursively Enumerable Sets Not Recursive in Each Other", Proc. Natl. Acad. Sci. U.S.A. vol. 43, p. 236 doi:10.1073/pnas.43.2.236
- 1957: "A criterion for completeness of degrees of unsolvability", Journal of Symbolic Logic 22(2): 159–160.
- 1958: "A Learning Machine: Part I", IBM Journal of Research and Development 2(1)
- 1958: "Three theorems on recursive enumeration. I. Decomposition. II. Maximal set. III. Enumeration without duplication", Journal of Symbolic Logic 23(3): 309–316.
- 1973: "Frequency Shifts in Emission and Absorption by Resonant Systems of Two-Level Atoms", (with S. R. Hartmann and J. T. Manassah), Phys. Reports 7C, 101
- 1974: "Dual Trees and Resummation Theorems" Journal of Mathematical Physics 16: 20 Bibcode:1975JMP....16...20F
- 1984: (with T. D. Lee) "Derivation of Regge’s Action from Einstein’s Theory of General Relativity", Nuclear Physics B 242, 145
- 1993: "The Electrostatics and Magnetostatics of a Conducting Disc", American Journal of Physics 61: 1084
- 1995: "Path Integrals in Polar Variables with Spontaneously Broken Symmetry", Journal of Mathematical Physics 36: 2675 doi:10.1063/1.531360
- 2005: (with S. Yancopoulos & O. Attie) "Efficient Sorting of Genomic Permutation by Translocation, inversion and block interchange", Bioinformatics 21: 3352–59 doi:10.1093/bioinformatics/bti535
