= Bartholdy =

Bartholdy is a surname. Notable people with the surname include:

- Abraham Mendelssohn Bartholdy (born Abraham Mendelssohn, 1776–1835), German Jewish banker and philanthropist
- Fanny Mendelssohn (later Fanny [Cäcilie] Mendelssohn Bartholdy, and Fanny Hensel, 1805–1847), pianist and composer, daughter of Abraham
- Felix Mendelssohn (Jakob Ludwig Felix Mendelssohn Bartholdy, 1809–1847), composer, pianist, organist and conductor, son of Abraham
- Rebecka Mendelssohn (Rebecka Henriette Mendelssohn Bartholdy, later Rebecka Henriette Lejeune Dirichlet, 1811–1858), daughter of Abraham
- Jakob Salomon Bartholdy (1779–1825), Prussian diplomat and art patron
- Paul Mendelssohn Bartholdy (1841–1880), German chemist and a pioneer in the manufacture of aniline dye
- Johan Bartholdy (1853–1904), Danish organist, composer, singing teacher, conductor and author of music theory books
- Mikael Bartholdy, Canadian paralympic volleyball player

== See also ==
- Bartholdi, a surname
- Mendelssohn family
- Mendelssohn-Bartholdy-Park (Berlin U-Bahn), a station
