= Michael Rumaker =

American author (1932–2019)

Michael Rumaker (March 5, 1932 - June 3, 2019) was an American author whose life intersected with writers and other artists identified with the Beat Generation; studied at Black Mountain College; and found inspiration in AIDS Coalition to Unleash Power (ACT UP) demonstrations of the 1980s. Rumaker is remembered for his semi-autobiographical novels that document his life as a gay man from the 1950s until the 2010s.

== Biography ==
Rumaker was born in Philadelphia. He graduated from Black Mountain College in 1955 and later wrote a memoir of his time there. He hitchhiked to San Francisco, where he encountered the literature of the Beat Generation. Returning to New York, he attended Columbia University and received an MFA in 1971, then he began teaching writing.

Rumaker's first collection was in 1959 in the new-writer showcase Short Story 2, which featured short stories from him and three other authors, including Gertrude Friedberg. His short stories in the book received a favourable review in The New York Times, where he was described as an impressive young writer.

His first book, The Butterfly, is a fictionalized memoir of his brief affair with a young Yoko Ono, published before Ono became famous. His short stories Gringos and other stories appeared in 1967. A revised and expanded version appeared in 1991. He began to write directly about his life as a gay man in the volumes A Day and a Night at the Baths (1979) and My First Satyrnalia (1981). The novel Pagan Days (1991) is told from the perspective of an 8-year-old boy struggling to understand his gay self. Black Mountain Days is a memoir of his time at Black Mountain College. In addition, there are portraits of many students and faculty (including the poets Robert Creeley, Charles Olson and Jonathan Williams) from 1952-1956.

Following his graduation from Black Mountain College, Rumaker made his way to the post-"Howl", pre-Stonewall riots gay literary milieu of San Francisco, where he entered the circle of Robert Duncan. His account of that time in the book Robert Duncan in San Francisco, first published by Donald Allen at his Grey Fox Press, gives an unvarnished look at the premier poet of the San Francisco Renaissance. Rumaker released previously unpublished letters between himself and Robert Duncan for a new edition, published by City Lights.

== Published works ==
- The Butterfly: A Story in Nine Parts (1962) Charles Scribner's Sons; (1968) Macdonald
- The Bar (1964) by Four Seasons Foundation
- "Exit 3" (1966) by Penguin Books
- Gringos and Other Stories (1967) by Grove Press
- Schwul (Queers) (1970) by März Verlag, Frankfurt am Main
- Robert Duncan in San Francisco (1976) by Grey Fox Press
- Crow Dog and Black Elk (1977) by Bezoar (Gloucester, MA)
- A Day and a Night at the Baths (1979) by Grey Fox Press (reprinted by Triton Books, 2010)
- My First Satyrnalia (1981) by Grey Fox Press, ISBN 0912516518
- To Kill a Cardinal (1992) by Arthur Mann Kaye, ISBN 0963296221
- Gringos and Other Stories (1997) by North Carolina Wesleyan College Press, ISBN 0933598262
- Pagan Days (1998) by Circumstantial Productions, ISBN 1891592106
- Black Mountain Days (2003) by Black Mountain Press, ISBN 0964902087 (reprinted by Spuyten Duyvil 2012)
- An Immodest Proposal (2004) by The Phi Press
- Pizza: Selected Poems (2005) by Circumstantial Productions, ISBN 1891592092
- Selected Letters of Michael Rumaker (2012) by The CUNY Poetics Document Initiative: Lost & Found, City University of New York, Center for the Humanities
- Robert Duncan in San Francisco: Expanded Edition (2013) by City Lights Publishers, ISBN 0872865908
