= Tropheops gracilior =

Conservation status
- Least Concern (IUCN 3.1)

Scientific classification
- Kingdom: Animalia
- Phylum: Chordata
- Class: Actinopterygii
- Order: Cichliformes
- Family: Cichlidae
- Genus: Tropheops
- Species: T. gracilior

Binomial name
- Tropheops gracilior (Trewavas, 1935)

Synonyms
- Pseudotropheus tropheops gracilior Trewavas, 1935; Pseudotropheus gracilior Trewavas, 1935

Species of fish

Tropheops gracilior is a species of cichlid endemic to Lake Malawi where it lives in caves.

This species can reach a length of 11.2 centimetres (4.4 in) TL.
