= Tropheops novemfasciatus =

Conservation status
- Least Concern (IUCN 3.1)

Scientific classification
- Kingdom: Animalia
- Phylum: Chordata
- Class: Actinopterygii
- Order: Cichliformes
- Family: Cichlidae
- Genus: Tropheops
- Species: T. novemfasciatus

Binomial name
- Tropheops novemfasciatus Regan, 1922

Synonyms
- Pseudotropheus novemfasciatus Regan, 1922

Species of fish

Tropheops novemfasciatus is a species of cichlid endemic to Lake Malawi where it prefers sheltered bays with rocks and vegetation, usually within 4 metres (13 ft) of the surface. This species can reach a length of 9 centimetres (3.5 in) SL. It can also be found in the aquarium trade.
