= Anatoly Styopin =

Russian mathematician (1940–2020)

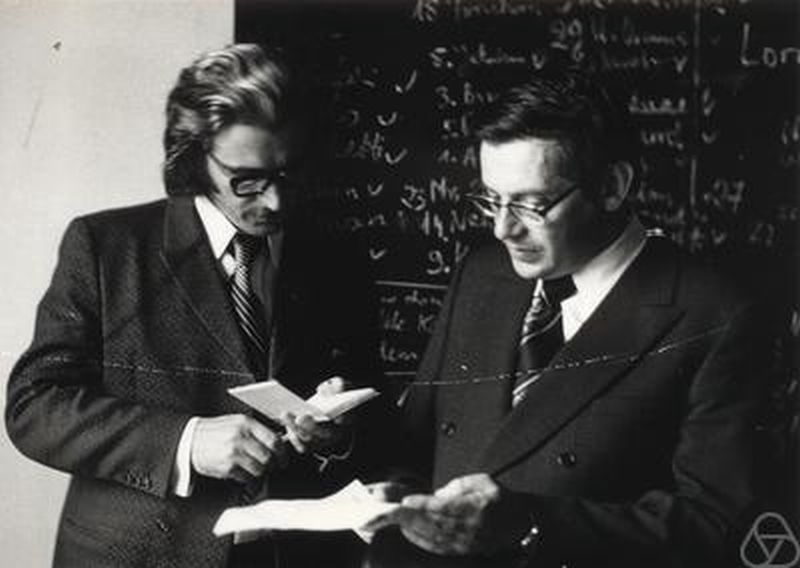
Anatoly Stepin (left) and Dmitri Anosov, Warsaw 1977

Anatoly Mikhailovich Styopin (Russian: Анатолий Михайлович Стёпин (may be transliterated as Stepin), 20 July 1940 – 7 November 2020) was a Soviet-Russian mathematician, specializing in dynamical systems and ergodic theory.

== Education and career ==
Stepin was born in Moscow on 20 July 1940. In 1965 he graduated from the Mechanics and Mathematics Faculty of Moscow State University. There he received in 1968 his Ph.D. under Felix Berezin with thesis "Применение метода аппроксимации динамических систем периодическими в спектральной теории" (Application of the method of approximation of dynamical systems by periodic spectral theory) and in 1986 his Russian doctorate (Doctor Nauk) with thesis "Спектральные и метрические свойства динамических систем и групп преобразований" (Spectral and metric properties of dynamical systems and groups of transformations). In 1970 he was an Invited Speaker at the ICM in Nice. In 1993 he was awarded the academic title of Professor in Mathematics. Since 1993, he has taught at the department of the theory of functions and functional analysis of the Mechanics and Mathematics Faculty of Moscow State University. In 2009 he was awarded the title of Honorary Professor of Moscow State University. His doctoral students include Rostislav Grigorchuk and Yiangdong Ye.

On 7 November 2020, Stepin died at the age of 80.

== Awards ==
- Kolmogorov Prize (together with Boris Markovich Gurevich and Valery lustinovich Oseledets) for 2009 — for their series of works ergodic theory and related topics
- Award of the Moscow Mathematical Society
