= Kolmogorov Prize =

The Kolmogorov Prize is a mathematical prize awarded by the Russian Academy of Sciences for outstanding results in the field of mathematics. It bears the name of the mathematician Andrey Kolmogorov.

The award was established by a Decree of the Presidium of the Russian Academy of Sciences on February 23, 1993. As a rule, it is awarded every three years.

== Awarded Scientists ==
The following scientists have won the award:

- 1994 — Albert Shiryaev
- 1997 — Nikolay Nekhoroshev
- 2000 — Sergey Nikolsky
- 2003 — Anatoli Vitushkin
- 2006 — Alexei Semenov
- 2006 — Andrey Muchnik
- 2009 — Boris Gurevich
- 2009 — Valeriy Oseledets
- 2009 — Anatoly Styopin
- 2012 — Boris Kashin
- 2015 — Aleksandr Borovkov
- 2015 — Anatoly Mogulsky
- 2018 — Vladimir Bogachev
- 2018 — Stanislav Shaposhnikov
- 2018 — Andrey Kirillov
- 2021 — Alexander Bulinsky
- 2024 — Nikolay Konstantinovich Vereshchagin
