= Gertrude Friedberg =

American dramatist

Gertrude Tonkonogy Friedberg
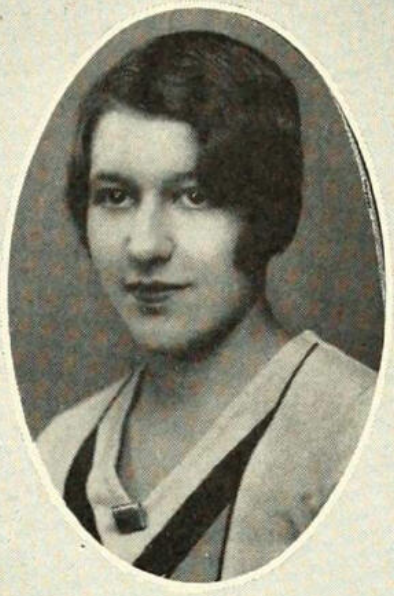
- Gertrude Tonkonogy, from the 1929 yearbook of Barnard College
- Born: Gertrude Tonkonogy; 17 March 1908; New York, New York, U.S.
- Died: 17 September 1989 (aged 81); New York, New York, U.S.
- Occupations: Playwright, writer

Gertrude (née Tonkonogy) Friedberg (March 17, 1908 – September 17, 1989) was an American playwright and writer.

== Life and career ==
Gertrude Tonkonogy was born in Brooklyn, New York in 1908 as one of 11 children. to George Tonkonogy, Sr. and Sadie König, both Jewish immigrants from Eastern Europe. Gertrude grew up in Brooklyn with her siblings; Abraham, Mamie, Henrietta, Archibald, Elizabeth, Eugene, and George.

Tonkonogy went to Wellesley College, and after one year, transferred to and graduated from, Barnard College with a B.A. in 1929. Tonkonogy made her first professional sale with the play Three Cornered Moon which was produced on Broadway (opening March 16, 1933) and starred Ruth Gordon and Brian Donlevy. It was almost immediately made into a film of the same name starring Claudette Colbert; the film opened in August 1933.

Shortly after her success with the play, Tonkonogy married Charles K. Friedberg, a doctor. She was thereafter credited as Gertrude Friedberg. Her second play, Town House, opened September 23, 1948. It was a comedy about the shortage of housing, adapted for theater from stories published in New Yorker, by John Cheever, produced by Max Gordon, and directed by George S. Kaufman at the National Theatre, for twelve performances.

She wrote several short stories through the 1950s, publishing in the magazines New World Writing, Esquire, The Atlantic, Story and The Magazine of Fantasy & Science Fiction. Friedberg's first—and only—collection was in 1959 in the new writer showcase Short Story 2; this volume featured five of her stories, as well as stories from three other authors including Michael Rumaker. Between 1958 and 1972, Friedberg published three science fiction stories, and one science fiction novel, The Revolving Boy (1966). The Encyclopedia of Science Fiction characterizes the novel as a "minor classic in the field." It would be Friedberg's only novel.

In the 1950s, Friedberg lived in Brooklyn, reviewed books on music, did editorial work on technical textbooks, and did substitute teaching at Stuyvesant High School. In the 1970s, she lived on Park Avenue.

According to the back page of an edition of The Revolving Boy published in 1980, Friedberg lived in New York, where she taught mathematics. Friedberg had two children, Richard and Barbara. She died of cancer in her Manhattan home, aged 81.

== Works ==
Plays

- Three Cornered Moon. Samuel French. 1933 – via archive.org.
- Town House (1948)

Novels

- "The Revolving Boy" (1966) Doubleday

Short Fiction

- Where Moth and Rust (September 1957) ( in The Atlantic) (in Short Story 2, New York: Charles Scribner's Sons; 1959)
- The Wayward Cravat (1958)" in: Tomorrows Children", editor: Isaac Asimov, Garden City, N.Y.: Doubleday 1966
- Six Cases of Vladimir (1961)
- The Short and Happy Death of George Frumkin (1963)
- For Whom the Girl Waits (1972)

== Legacy ==
- Gertrude Friedberg Scholarship, Stuyvesant High School, New York City
