= Friedberger Baggersee =

Lake in Bavaria, Germany

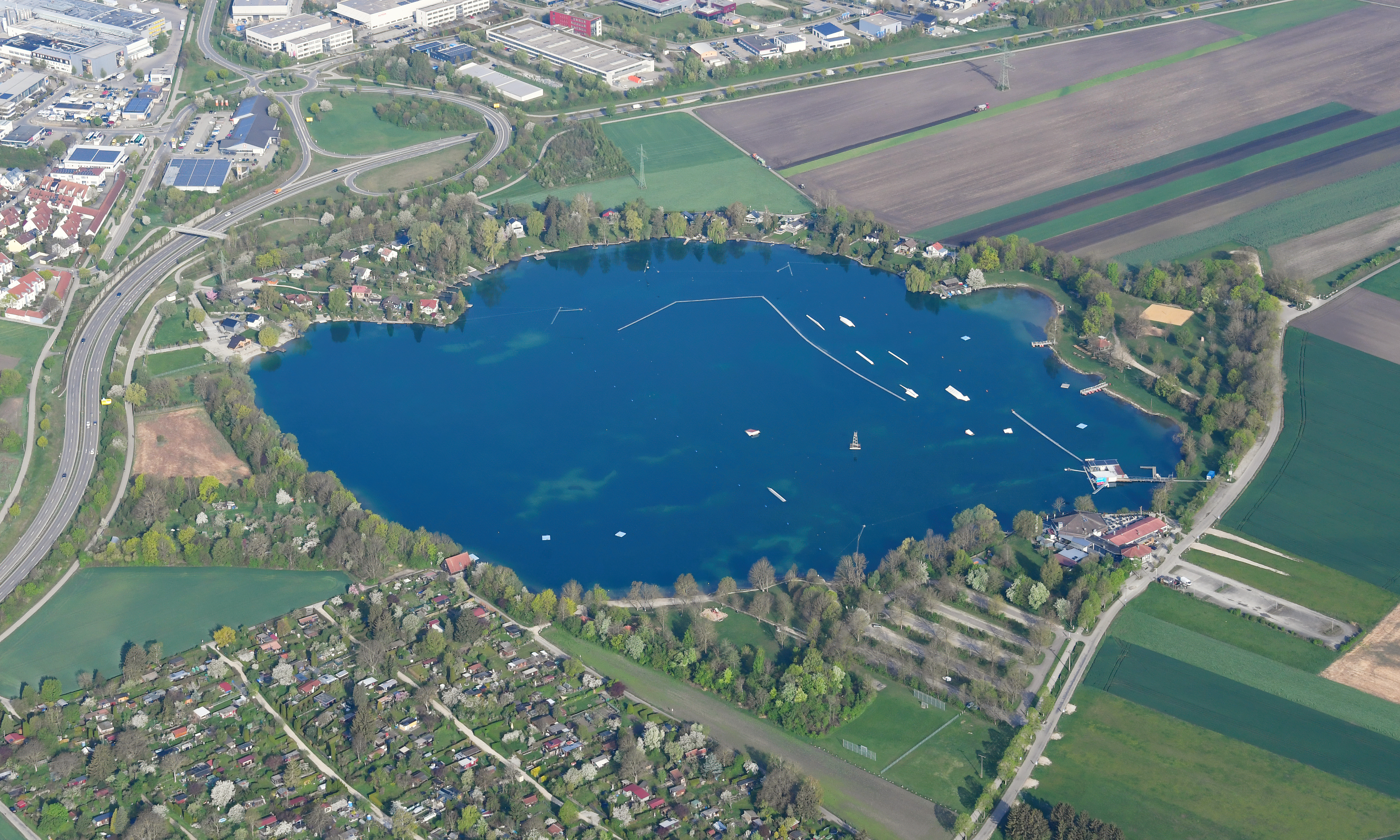

- Location within Bavaria
- Location: Swabia, Bavaria
- Coordinates: 48°21′45.36″N 10°57′50.87″E
- Primary inflows: groundwater, precipitation
- Primary outflows: groundwater
- Basin countries: Germany
- Max. length: ca. 450 m (1,480 ft)
- Max. width: 430 m (1,410 ft)
- Surface area: 18 ha (44 acres)
- Surface elevation: 480 m (1,570 ft)
- Settlements: Augsburg,

Friedberger Baggersee is a lake in Augsburg Swabia, Bavaria, Germany. At an elevation of 480 m, its surface area is 18 ha.
