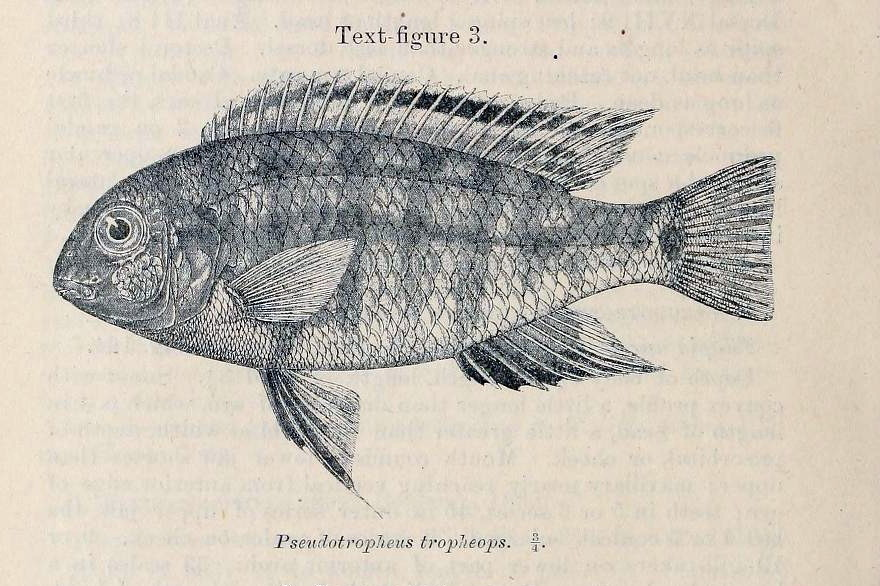

Conservation status
- Least Concern (IUCN 3.1)

Scientific classification
- Kingdom: Animalia
- Phylum: Chordata
- Class: Actinopterygii
- Order: Cichliformes
- Family: Cichlidae
- Genus: Tropheops
- Species: T. tropheops

Binomial name
- Tropheops tropheops Regan, 1922

Synonyms
- Pseudotropheus tropheops Regan, 1922; Pseudotropheus tropheops tropheops Regan, 1922

= Tropheops tropheops =

Species of fish

Tropheops tropheops is a species of cichlid endemic to Lake Malawi preferring areas with rocky substrates. This species can reach a length of 14 centimetres (5.5 in) TL. It can also be found in the aquarium trade.
