= Eric Friedberg =

American lawyer

Eric Friedberg is an American lawyer and a former Assistant United States Attorney who specializes in the field of cybercrime, Intellectual Property and Securities Litigation practices.

== Career ==
In 1983, after graduation from law school, Friedberg joined the law firm of Skadden, Arps, Slate, Meagher & Flom in New York City where he was an associate in the Intellectual Property and Securities Litigation practices. Friedberg then spent from 1989 to 2000 as an Assistant United States Attorney in the U.S. Attorney’s Office in Brooklyn, New York. There, he became the Chief of the Narcotics Unit, a Senior Litigation Counsel and the lead cybercrime prosecutor, which then carried the title Computer and Telecommunications Coordinator. He was also a member of the New York Electronic Crimes Task Force. In the cyber arena, Friedberg investigated and prosecuted cases involving hacking, denial of service attacks, propagation of malicious viruses, illegal data wiretapping, and cyber-extortion. His most prominent Narcotics case was the investigation, prosecution and conviction of accomplices who assassinated a former editor of the New York City Spanish daily newspaper El Diario on orders of the Cali Cartel in retaliation for unfavorable news coverage.

As a cybercrime prosecutor, Friedberg obtained one the very first court-authorized wiretaps of an e-mail box in a criminal case against a German engineer who invented and sold equipment capable of intercepting the cell phone communications of undercover officers.

In 2000, Friedberg joined former F.B.I. Special Agent Ed Stroz in the fledgling Stroz Associates, LLC, which in 2003 became Stroz Friedberg LLC, a consulting and technical services firm specializing in digital forensics, cybercrime response, proactive computer security, investigations and electronic discovery. As Co-President, Friedberg oversaw geographic and service line growth and, in 2007, co-led with Stroz the securing of a $30 million investment in the firm by Greenhill Capital, Inc.

Friedberg and his firm served as digital forensics experts for Facebook in wake of Paul Ceglia’s lawsuit against the social media company. Friedberg was also brought on by Uber to conduct intellectual property due diligence on Otto, a company that Uber acquired in 2016. He also served as Uber’s witness in the Uber v. Waymo trial in 2018.

In November 2016, Friedberg, Stroz and Michael Patsalos-Fox negotiated the sale of Stroz Friedberg – then a 550 person, $120m year firm—to Aon plc, and the firm became part of Aon Cyber Solutions, of which Friedberg became Co-President.
