= Friedeberg =

Friedeberg is a German surname. Notable people with the surname include:

- Pedro Friedeberg (1936–2026), Mexican painter and designer
- Raphael Friedeberg (1863–1940), German anarchist

== See also ==
- Friedberg (disambiguation)
- Friedeburg
- Mirsk, called Friedeberg am Queis in German
