= Simeon Adlow Friedberg =

American physicist

Simeon Adlow Friedberg (1925 – December 4, 2005) was an American physicist.

== Biography ==
Friedberg grew up in Squirrel Hill and attended Allderdice High School, from which he graduated in 1942. He was enrolled into Harvard College by the age of 16 but was drafted into the Army at the same time to fight in World War II. During those three years he finished the Officer Candidate School in Fort Benning and became a second lieutenant. When he returned to Harvard in 1945, he obtained degree in chemistry by 1947 and received master's degree from the Carnegie Institute of Technology in both chemistry and physics a year later following by a doctorate in 1951.

He obtained Fulbright scholarship and studied at Leiden, Netherlands, from 1951 to 1952. From 1952 till his retirement he worked as an instructor at Carnegie Institute of Technology and was also professor of physics and chairman from 1972 to 1980 there. He died on December 4, 2005, of Parkinson's disease at the age of 80.
