= Albert Muchnik =

Russian mathematician (1934–2019)

Albert Abramovich Muchnik
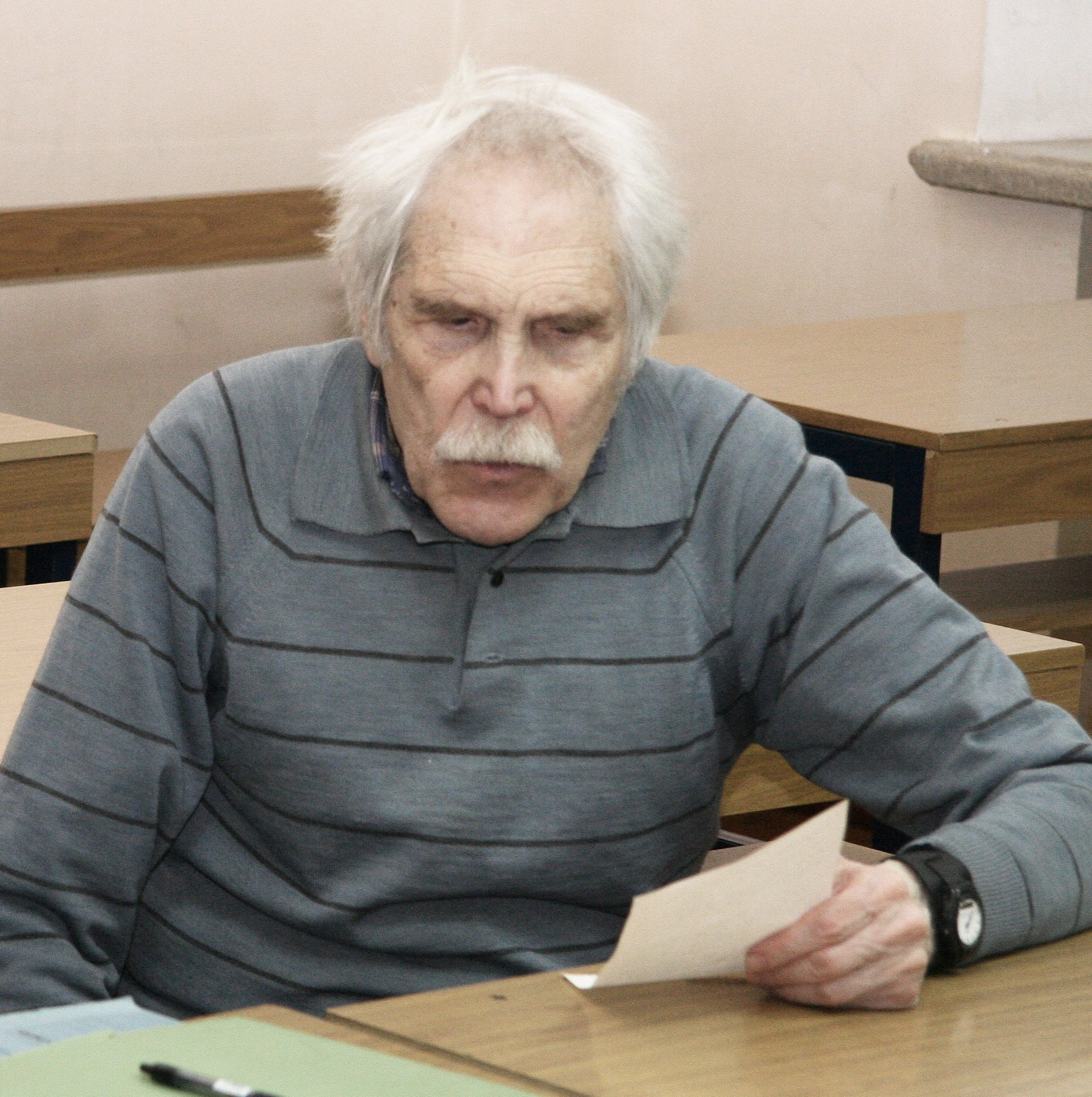
- Albert Muchnik
- Born: 2 January 1934
- Died: 14 February 2019 (aged 85)
- Education: Moscow State Pedagogical Institute
- Known for: Friedberg–Muchnik theorem, Muchnik degrees, Contributions to Medvedev's theory of mass problems
- Spouse: Nadezhda Ermolaeva
- Children: Andrey Muchnik
- Scientific career
- Fields: Mathematics, Mathematical logic, Foundations of mathematics
- Doctoral advisor: Pyotr Novikov

Albert Abramovich Muchnik (2 January 1934 – 14 February 2019) was a Russian mathematician who worked in the field of foundations and mathematical logic.

== Biography ==
He received his Ph.D. from Moscow State Pedagogical Institute in 1959 under the advisorship of Pyotr Novikov. From there, he wrote his dissertation titled Solution to the Post Reducibility Problem. Muchnik's most significant contribution was on the subject of relative computability. He and Richard Friedberg independently introduced the priority method which gave an affirmative answer to Post's problem regarding the existence of recursively enumerable Turing degrees between 0 and 0' . This result, now known as the Friedberg–Muchnik theorem, opened study of the Turing degrees of the recursively enumerable sets which turned out to possess a very complicated and non-trivial structure.

Muchnik also made significant contributions to Medvedev's theory of mass problems, introducing a generalisation of Turing degrees, called "Muchnik degrees", in 1963. Muchnik also elaborated Kolmogorov's proposal of viewing intuitionism as "calculus of problems" and proved that the lattice of Muchnik degrees is Brouwerian.

Muchnik was married to the Russian mathematician Nadezhda Ermolaeva. Their son Andrey Muchnik, who died in 2007, was also a mathematician working in foundations of mathematics. Albert Muchnik died in February 2019.

== Selected publications ==
- A. A. Muchnik, On the unsolvability of the problem of reducibility in the theory of algorithms. (in Russian) Doklady Akademii Nauk SSSR (N.S.), vol. 108 (1956), pp. 194–197
