= Charles K. Friedberg =

American cardiologist (1905–1972)

- Born: September 14, 1905; Brooklyn, New York, U.S.
- Died: July 14, 1972 (aged 66) near Cobleskill, New York, U.S.
- Occupation: Cardiologist at Mount Sinai Hospital, Manhattan
- Known for: Diseases of the Heart (1949)

Charles Kaye Friedberg (1905–1972) was an American cardiologist, known for his medical textbook Diseases of the Heart, which was a standard reference in cardiology during the 1950s and 1960s.

Friedberg received in 1925 his bachelor's degree from Columbia University and in 1929 his medical degree from the Columbia University College of Physicians and Surgeons (Vagelos College of Physicians and Surgeons).

He interned at Mount Sinai and took postgraduate work as an Emanuel Libman Fellow in Amsterdam and Vienna. A diplomate of the American Board of Internal Medicine, Dr. Friedberg served on the Council of the National Heart and Lung Institute, and was a Master of the American College of Physicians, a Fellow of the American College of Cardiology and a member of the Academy of Medicine.

An acknowledged expert in the recognition and management of subacute bacterial endocarditis, and coauthor with Emanuel Libman of the classic monograph on the topic in 1941, his diagnostic dictum has helped guide several generations of physicians: “The diagnosis of subacute bacterial endocarditis should be assumed as most probable whenever a patient with an organic cardiac murmur experiences fever, without apparent cause, for more than one week” (Friedberg, 1949, p. 793).

In the mid-1930s, with Dr. Louis Gross, Friedberg investigated the cardiac pathoanatomy of rheumatic fever. Friedberg was a consulting cardiologist, and from 1956 to 1969 chief cardiologist, at Mount Sinai Hospital, and was a clinical professor of medicine at Mount Sinai Medical School. He was the author, among other books, of Diseases of the Heart, published in Philadelphia by the W. B. Saunders Company in 1949, with a 2nd edition in 1959 and a 3rd edition in 1966. In 1958 he was the founding editor of the journal Progress in Cardiovascular Diseases. He was appointed editor-in-chief of the American Heart Association's journal Circulation, for a six-year term that started in January 1971, as successor to Howard B. Burchell (1908–2009).

In 1933 Dr. Friedberg married Gertrude Tonkonogy, who was the author of the Broadway play Three Cornered Hat. Upon his death in an automobile accident in 1972 he was survived by his widow, a son Richard, a daughter Barbara, and two grandchildren.

According to the cardiologist Eugene Braunwald, Charles K. Friedburg was one of a small group of outstanding pioneers of cardiology as practiced in the era of medicine from the 1940s to the early 1970s; according to Braunwald the other pioneers included Charles Laubry, Samuel A. Levine, Thomas Lewis, James Mackenzie, John Parkinson, Paul Dudley White, and Paul Hamilton Wood.

As it turned out, Friedberg was the last American to write a single-authored textbook of cardiology. The reason: knowledge in cardiology and virtually every other major field of medicine was expanding too quickly for any one individual to master or write about quickly enough. The new model for textbooks would be one in which editors sought numerous experts to write chapters on specific topics, and tried to impose a consistent style and philosophy on the submitted materials.
