= Michael Röckner =

Mathematician

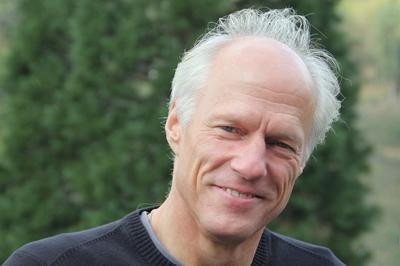
Michael Röckner

Michael Röckner is a mathematician working in the fields of Stochastic analysis and Mathematical Physics.

He obtained his PhD at Bielefeld University in 1984 under the supervision of Sergio Albeverio and Christopher John Preston.

Together with Claudia Prévôt, he wrote the book A Concise Course on Stochastic Partial Differential Equations.

- Prévôt, Claudia (2007). A concise course on stochastic partial differential equations. Berlin New York: Springer. ISBN 978-3-540-70781-3. OCLC 185027082.
