= Iterated monodromy group =

In geometric group theory and dynamical systems the iterated monodromy group of a covering map is a group describing the monodromy action of the fundamental group on all iterations of the covering. A single covering map between spaces is therefore used to create a tower of coverings, by placing the covering over itself repeatedly. In terms of the Galois theory of covering spaces, this construction on spaces is expected to correspond to a construction on groups. The iterated monodromy group provides this construction, and it is applied to encode the combinatorics and symbolic dynamics of the covering, and provide examples of self-similar groups.

== Definition ==
The iterated monodromy group of f is the following quotient group:

$$\mathrm{IMG}f := \frac{\pi_1 (X, t)}{\bigcap_{n\in\mathbb{N}}\mathrm{Ker}\,\digamma^n}$$

where :

- $f:X_1\rightarrow X$ is a covering of a path-connected and locally path-connected topological space X by its subset $X_1$,
- $\pi_1 (X, t)$ is the fundamental group of X and
- $\digamma :\pi_1 (X, t)\rightarrow \mathrm{Sym}\,f^{-1}(t)$ is the monodromy action for f.
- $\digamma^n:\pi_1 (X, t)\rightarrow \mathrm{Sym}\,f^{-n}(t)$ is the monodromy action of the $n^\mathrm{th}$ iteration of f, $\forall n\in\mathbb{N}_0$.

== Action ==
The iterated monodromy group acts by automorphism on the rooted tree of preimages

$$T_f := \bigsqcup_{n\ge 0}f^{-n}(t),$$

where a vertex $z\in f^{-n}(t)$ is connected by an edge with $f(z)\in f^{-(n-1)}(t)$.

== Examples ==
=== Iterated monodromy groups of rational functions ===
Let :

- f be a complex rational function
- $P_f$ be the union of forward orbits of its critical points (the post-critical set).

If $P_f$ is finite (or has a finite set of accumulation points), then the iterated monodromy group of f is the iterated monodromy group of the covering $f:\hat C\setminus f^{-1}(P_f)\rightarrow \hat C\setminus P_f$, where $\hat C$ is the Riemann sphere.

Iterated monodromy groups of rational functions usually have exotic properties from the point of view of classical group theory. Most of them are infinitely presented, many have intermediate growth.

==== IMG of polynomials ====
The Basilica group is the iterated monodromy group of the polynomial $z^2 - 1$

== See also ==
- Growth rate (group theory)
- Amenable group
- Complex dynamics
- Julia set
