= List of rectors of Moscow State University =

This is the list of rectors of Moscow State University. Since the foundation of the university in 1755 there were 44 rectors.

- Alexei Argamakov 1755–1757
- Ivan Melissino 1757–1763
- Mikhail Kheraskov 1763–1770
- Mikhail Priklonsky 1771–1784
- Pavel Fonvizin 1784–1796
- Ivan Turgenev 1796–1803
- Khariton Chebotaryov 1803–1805
- Pyotr Strakhov 1805–1807
- Feodor Bause 1807–1808
- Ivan Geim 1808–1819
- Anton Antonsky-Prokopovich 1819–1826
- Ivan Dvigubsky 1826–1833
- Alexei Boldyrev 1833–1836
- Mikhail Kachenovsky 1836–1842
- Arkady Alfonsky 1842–1848
- Dmitri Perevoshchikov 1848–1850
- Arkady Alfonsky 1850–1863
- Sergey Barshev 1863–1870
- Sergey Solovyov 1871–1877
- Nikolay Tikhonravov 1877–1883
- Nikolay Bogolepov 1883–1887
- Nikolay Tikhonravov 1887–1891
- Gavriil Ivanov 1891–1893
- Nikolay Bogolepov 1893–1895
- Pavel Nekrasov 1895–1898
- Nikolai Andreevich Zverev 1898
- Dmitri Zernov 1898–1899
- Aleksandr Tikhomirov 1899–1904
- Leonid Lakhtin 1904–1905
- Sergei Trubetskoy 1905
- Alexander Manuilov 1905–1911
- Matvei Lyubavsky 1911–1917
- Mikhail Menzbir 1917–1919
- Vladimir Gulevich 1919
- Mikhail Novikov 1919–1920
- Dmitri Bogolepov 1920–1921
- Viacheslav Volgin 1921–1925
- Andrey Vyshinsky 1925–1928
- Ivan Udaltsov 1928–1930
- Vasiliy Kasatkin 1930–1934
- Alexei Butyagin 1934–1943
- Ilya Galkin 1943–1947
- Alexander Nesmeyanov 1948–1951
- Ivan Petrovsky 1951–1973
- Rem Khokhlov 1973–1977
- Anatoly Logunov 1977–1992
- Viktor Sadovnichiy 1992–present

== See also ==
- List of Moscow State University people
