= Imperial Moscow University =

University in Moscow (1755–1917)

- Императорский Московский университет
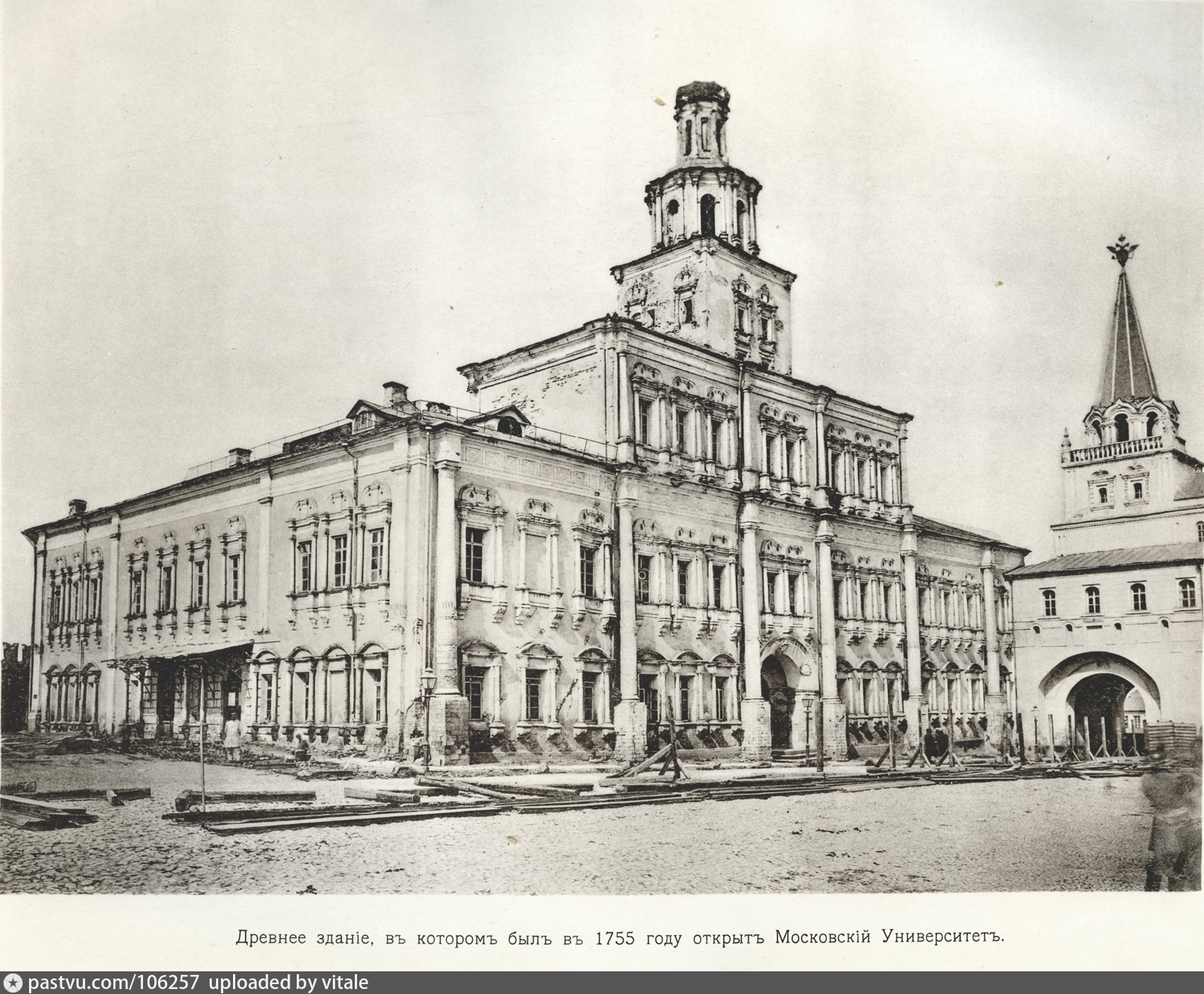
- Building «Aptekarskij dom» on Red Square that housed Moscow University (1755–1787)
- Motto: Science is the clear knowledge of truth, the enlightenment of the mind
- Type: Imperial University of the Russian Empire
- Active: 1755–1917
- Founder: Ivan Shuvalov
- Location: Moscow, Russian Empire

Imperial Moscow University (Russian: Императорский Московский университет) was one of the oldest universities of the Russian Empire, established in 1755. It was the first of the twelve imperial universities of the Russian Empire. Its legacy is continued as Lomonosov Moscow State University, which occupies some of its original buildings.

== History of the University ==
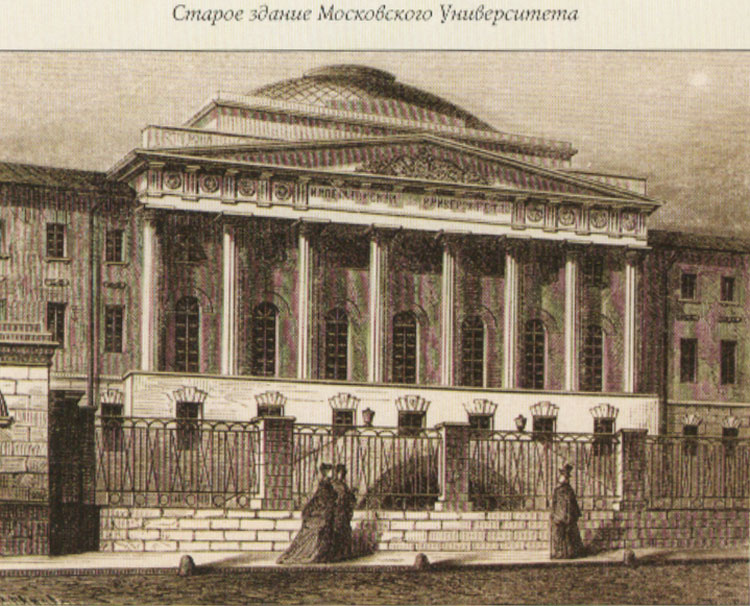
Main building of Moscow University in Mokhovaya Street (1787)

Ivan Shuvalov and Mikhail Lomonosov promoted the idea of a university in Moscow, and Russian Empress Elizabeth decreed its establishment on 23 January [O.S. 12 January] 1755. The first lectures were given on 7 May [O.S. 26 April] 1755. Russians still celebrate 25 January as Students' Day. (Foundation of the university is traditionally associated with the feast of Saint Tatiana, celebrated by the Russian Orthodox Church on 12 January Julian, which corresponds to 25 January Gregorian in the 20th–21st centuries.)

The present Moscow State University originally occupied the Aptekarskij dom on Red Square from 1755 to 1787.

Catherine the Great transferred the university to a Neoclassical building on the other side of Mokhovaya Street; that main building was constructed between 1782 and 1793 in the Neo-Palladian style, to a design by Matvei Kazakov, and rebuilt by Domenico Giliardi after the fire consumed much of Moscow in 1812.

In the 18th century, the university had three departments: philosophy, medicine, and law. The Medical Faculty was established together with the University in 1755 and became the first university medical faculty in Russia. Medical teaching began in 1758. During the nineteenth century it developed into one of the leading centres of university medical education and biomedical research in the Russian Empire. In 1930 the Faculty was separated from Moscow State University and reorganised as the First Moscow Medical Institute, the predecessor of the present-day First Moscow State Medical University.

A preparatory college was affiliated with the university until its abolition in 1812. In 1779, Mikhail Kheraskov founded a boarding school for noblemen (Благородный пансион), which in 1830 became a gymnasium for the Russian nobility. The university press, run by Nikolay Novikov in the 1780s, published the most popular newspaper in Imperial Russia: Moskovskie Vedomosti.

=== University Statute of 1804 ===
Moscow University was transferred from the Senate to the Ministry of Education of the Russian Empire. Under the new Charter of the Imperial University of Moscow in 1804, the university was to be run by the University Council, which included ordinary and distinguished professors headed by the rector.

The rector was annually elected by a professorial assembly (closed voting with the help of white and black balls) and was approved personally by the Emperor of the Russian Empire. The deans of the faculties were also subject to election. The first elected rector was the historian and geographer Khariton Chebotarev. At the meetings of the council, not only the appointment of professors, honorary members, and adjuncts of the university was decided, but also the appointment of teachers in the gymnasium and the school of the district, and even the annual test of students. The meetings were to be held at least once a month. Annually the Council elected deans of faculties, which were approved by the Minister of Education.

The university was divided into four departments (faculty): moral and political sciences, physical and mathematical sciences, verbal sciences, medical sciences. Each department held its own meetings, on which a schedule was drawn up, tests were conducted for those wishing to obtain a degree, economic and financial issues were considered. The Faculty of Medicine was divided into departments: clinical (therapy), surgical, obstetrics. At the Faculty of Law, the teaching of natural, folk and Roman rights was introduced.

In total, according to the statute of 1804, 28 chairs were laid.

By the time Napoleon invaded the university, there were 215 students.

=== French invasion of Russia ===
Napoleon's invasion was a serious test for the Moscow University, which lost buildings, museum collections, scientific equipment, a library, and an archive that had lost many professors and students during the war in the Moscow fire that destroyed Moscow.

In August 1812, Moscow University was evacuated to Nizhny Novgorod. 42 boxes with the most valuable exhibits of the Museum of Natural History, books, instruments and instruments were sent. Also in the evacuation were sent to the professors, students and students, the university treasury, the most valuable books and things (including the minutes of the Conference, referring to the first years of the university). The road to Nizhny Novgorod, where Moscow University received a temporary shelter, took 19 days.

At the beginning of September, the main building of the University on Mokhovaya burned to ashes, as well as almost all university buildings in the adjacent territory.

After the French retreat in December 1812, the rector of the university returned to Moscow and a temporary commission was established to manage the university as part of the rector and the four senior professors in Moscow. The buildings for the temporary placement of the university were found not far from Mokhovaya Street. In May 1813, the last professors and convoys with the property of the university returned from Nizhny Novgorod. In August 1813, the classes of all four faculties of the university resumed. In the same year, 129 students were accepted. The final restoration of the university was completed in 1819 with the completion of the reconstruction of the main building on Mokhovaya.

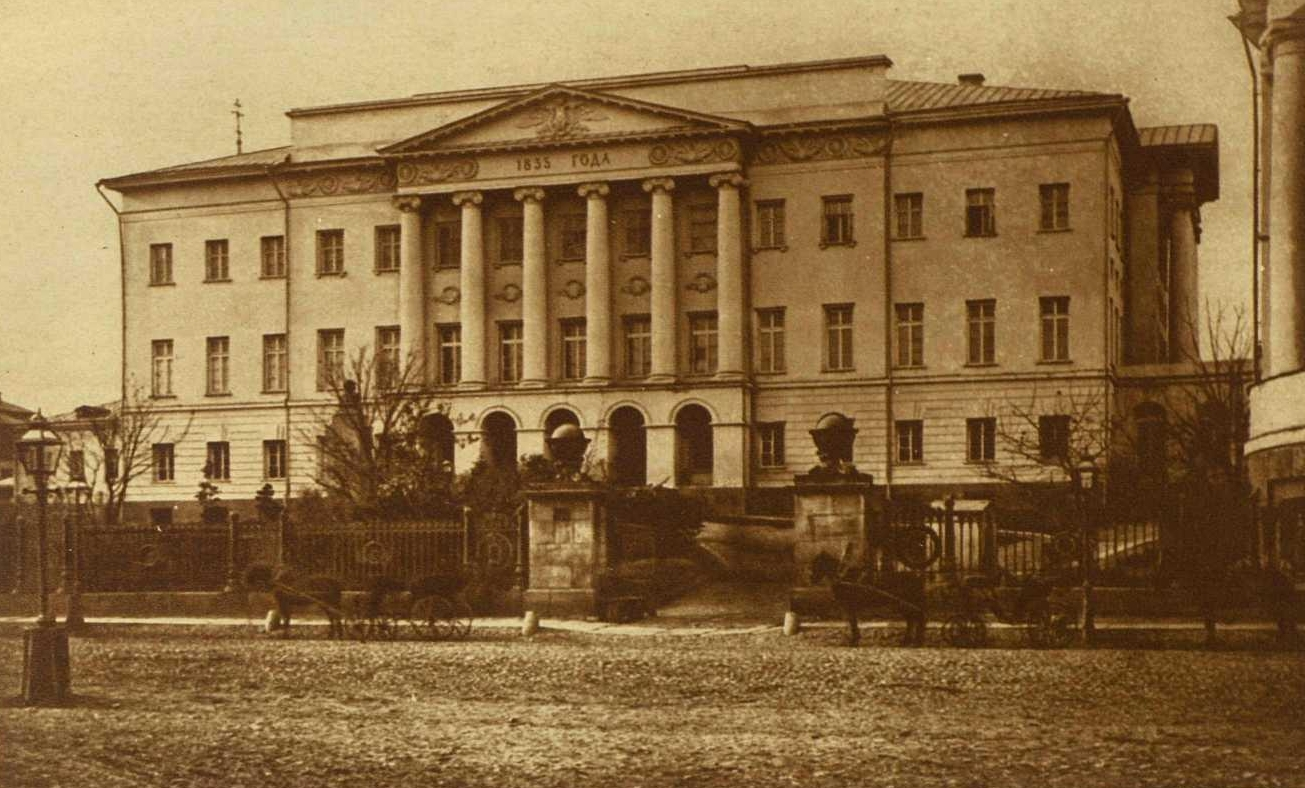
Auditor Corps of Moscow University in Mokhovaya Street (1835)

University buildings were rebuilt again by 1819. By 1826 the library (up to 30,000 volumes) and the Mint-cabinet (3731 coins) had been restored.

Since the beginning of the 1820s, the number of students has constantly increased:

Year	1822	1823	1824	1825
Number of students	695	768	800	876

The visit of Emperor Nicholas I to Moscow University in 1826 resulted in the dismissal of the rector, who in his opinion did not implement the government's decisions with sufficient vigor. Under the ban was put the teaching of philosophy at the university, resumed only in 1845. The Emperor's dissatisfaction with the appearance of the Moscow students he met near the Kremlin entailed the introduction of a compulsory wearing of student uniforms, which students had to wear outside the university.

From the reaction of the 1820s, Moscow University suffered less than other universities of the Russian Empire. In 1833, a second building was purchased for the University of Moscow, located next to the main building on Mokhovaya Street, which was rebuilt in 1835 and named Auditor Corps.

=== University Statute of 1835 ===
The University Statute of 1835 was the first general statute for all universities that introduced uniform rules for their existence. The new charter severely restricted university autonomy, abolished the university court that existed since the opening of the university, strengthened the general dependence of universities on administrative bodies. The powers of the rector and the competence of the University Council were significantly reduced. Inspector control over students was toughened. The tuition fee was raised (1841), which led to a general reduction in students, and a change in their composition. Suspecting the universities and their pets for their unreliability, the emperor issued a decree reducing the number of students. The number of students of the three main faculties was limited to three hundred people (1848). An exception was made only for the medical faculty. The rector was appointed Minister of Public Education and approved by the emperor.

At the same time, the charter also introduced changes that pertained to the structure of universities: the range of subjects studied was expanded, the number of departments increased, which allowed to increase their scientific level. The charter of 1835 introduced a four-year course of study, and the number of chairs was increased to 35. Auxiliary institutions at the university continued to develop: an astronomical observatory (1828) was founded, an office of comparative anatomy and physiology (1834), a hospital clinic was open and an anatomical-pathological cabinet 1846). In 1841 the medical and surgical academy existing in Moscow merged with the Medical Faculty of the university.

The forties and fifties were the heyday of the scientific activity of the Moscow University. Stepan Shevyrev and Fedor Buslaev read the history of Russian literature, Osip Bodyansky – Slavic languages, Timofey Granovsky and Pyotr Kudryavtsev – a universal story, Sergey Solovyov – Russian history, Konstantin Kavelin – the history of Russian legislation, Alexander Fischer von Waldheim – botany. In the second half of this century, Anatoly Bogdanov, Aleksandr Stoletov, August Davidov, Alexei Kozhevnikov, Nikolai Storozhenko, Leonid Kamarovsky, Alexander Chuprov, Sergei Muromtsev, Ivan Yanzhul, Vasily Klyuchevsky, Nikolai Tikhonravov, Kliment Timiryazev, Maxim Kovalevsky, Dmitry Anuchin, Nikolai Bugaev, Ivan Sechenov, Nikolai Zhukovsky, Vasili Zinger, Mikhail Menzbier, Nikolai Zograf, Friedrich Erismann, Pavel Vinogradov, Vsevolod Miller.

The number of students, initially increasing, falls during the reaction period:

Year	1836	1840	1846	1847	1848	1849	1850	1852	1854
Number of students	438	889	1088	1198	1168	902	821	861	1061

=== University Statute of 1863 ===
Student excitements of the 1860s were reflected in Moscow University, but they did not lead to its closure, as happened in St. Petersburg. In April 1855, the decree of Emperor Alexander II "On the admission to take an unlimited number of students to universities" was followed.

The Charter of 1863 is the most liberal of the university statutes of the Russian Empire. The statute restored autonomy to universities and weakened government custody of them. The scope of the Council of the university was expanded. The rector and deans were again elected, although the persons elected for their replacement had to be approved: the rector was the emperor, the deans were the minister of public education.

The new university charter created more favorable conditions for the development of science and education in Russia. According to the new statute, the staff of the Moscow University and the number of departments in its faculties were enlarged. There were 11 chairs at the Faculty of History and Philology, 10 in the Physics and Mathematics Department, 11 in the law faculty, and 23 at the medical school.

If in the original structure of the Imperial University of Moscow in the 18th century three faculties were provided for only 10 departments, in 1804 there were 28, in 1835 there were 35, then in 1863 their number increased to 53, and by 1884 to 56.

In the 1870s the number of students did not change significantly:

Year	1871	1873	1875 1876	1878	1880
Number of students	1541	1256	1259	1568	1643

=== University Statute of 1884 ===
The Charter limited the autonomy of the university, the role of the trustee of the educational district and the rector of the university, who was now elected Minister of Public Education, was significantly increased. The rights of the Councils of professors were minimized. The choice of the deans of the faculties was now assigned to the district trustee instead of the faculty meeting.

By the beginning of 1896, the following educational institutions have been attached to the Moscow University: the library (236,630 volumes and 135,763 titles), student libraries at the Faculty of History and Philology, at the mathematical and natural departments of the Faculty of Physics and Mathematics, at the law and medical faculties, arts and antiquities), an astronomical observatory, a mechanical cabinet, a physical cabinet with a laboratory, a cabinet of physical geography, a zoological museum, an anthropological museum, an office for comparative anatomy, a geological cabinet, a mineralogical study and a laboratory, a botanical garden, an anatomy and plant physiology department, an analytical and organic department of a chemical laboratory, a laboratory for inorganic chemistry, a technical laboratory, a normal anatomy room, a histological office, a pharmacological and pharmaceutical cabinet and laboratory, neurological museum, institute of pathological anatomy, forensic medicine room, surgical surgery room and surgical anatomy Pharmacological Institute with clinical laboratory, and t-general pathology, hygiene institute, physiological institute (laboratory), after reconstruction (1892) belonged to the first class facilities of this kind).

In 1884–1897, the medical faculty for private donations and with the financial support of the government built a «Clinical Town» at Devichye Pole, between the Garden Ring and the Novodevichy Convent. The buildings were designed by the architect Konstantin Bykovsky. The consultants of the project were such university doctors as Nikolai Sklifosovsky and Fyodor Erisman. By the end of the XIX century, the Medical Faculty of Moscow University had 13 clinics and 12 research institutes.

Despite the tightening of rules since the beginning of the 1880s, the number of students has grown steadily:

Year	1880	1881	1883	1885	1887	1890
Number of students	1,643	2,413	2,598	2,874	3,182	3,471

By the beginning of 1896, the university had 4,147 students, 111 third-party students, and 153 pharmacist assistants. Of the 4,147 students at the Faculty of Law there were 1,587 people, on the medical faculty – 1,380, on the physico-mathematical – 929, on the historical and philological – 251.

As of the beginning of 1896, the teaching staff of the university included 233 teachers, including: 1 professor of theology, 56 ordinary professors, 37 extraordinary professors, 5 reviewers, 4 lecturers, 130 privat-docents.

=== The Provisional Rules of 1905 ===
The roots of student unrest in the university reach deep into the nineteenth century. In 1905, a social-democratic organization emerged at the university and called for the overthrow of the Czarist government and the establishment of a republic in Russia. The imperial government repeatedly threatened to close the university.

The development of university science and teaching faced with difficulties associated with the activation of the student movement and the politicization of university life. In 1899—1907, the Moscow University was repeatedly forced to stop studying in connection with student rallies and gatherings. Measures of the Ministry of Public Education to curb the student movement, aimed at limiting the university autonomy, caused a negative reaction of the liberal-minded part of the professors.

Temporary rules – a legislative act, supplementing the Charter of 1884, liberalizing the order of the administrative structure of universities. The decree "On the Enactment of the Provisional Rules for the Management of Higher Educational Institutions of the Ministry of Public Education" was approved by Emperor Nicholas II in August 1905. The appearance of the decree was connected with the events of the First Russian Revolution of 1905-1907. Temporary rules were issued in connection with the termination of studies at universities due to student unrest. The norms of the Charter of 1884, which caused the greatest public protest, were revised in them.

The rules provided for "pending the introduction of new statutes of higher education institutions in legislation" a number of new rights: faculty councils (faculty meetings)—elect deans and their secretaries from faculty professors and faculty with the subsequent approval of elected persons by the Ministry of Education. The councils of universities were responsible for "maintaining the correct course of study life at the university."

Proceedings on student affairs, as in the Charter of 1863, were entrusted to the university court. Student affairs were entirely the responsibility of the university, and not officials of the Ministry of Education.

The new university charter prepared in the ministry was never put into effect because of subsequent revolutionary events in 1917.

=== The Crisis of 1911 ===
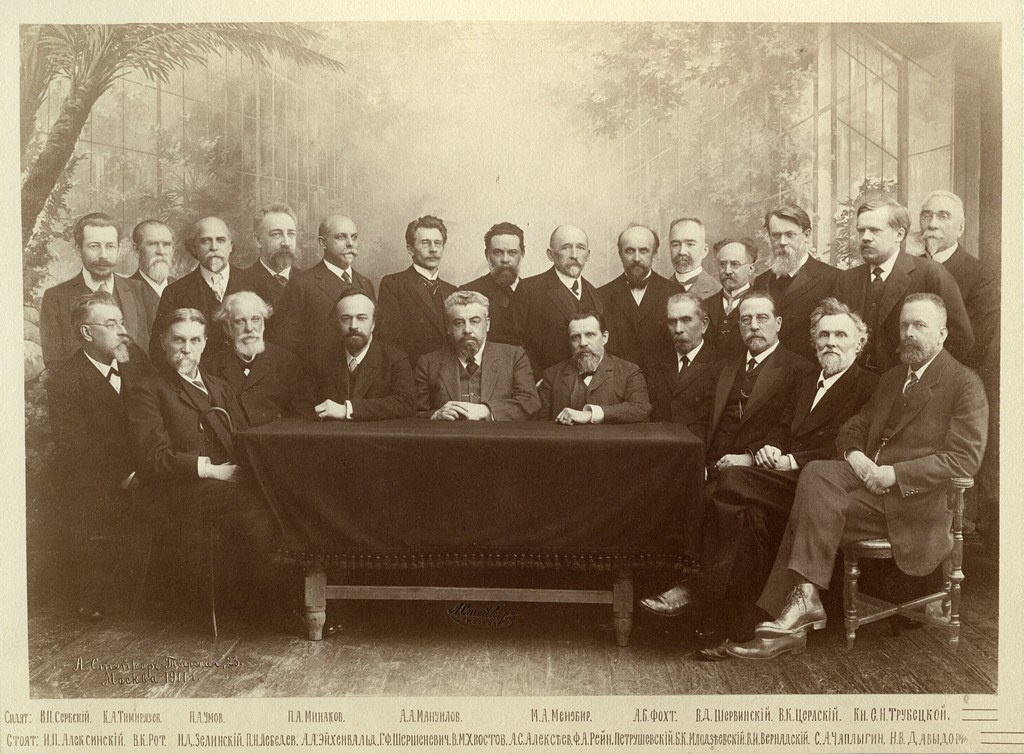
Professors of the Moscow University, who resigned in protest against the arbitrariness of the authorities. In the photo, sit: Vladimir Serbsky, Kliment Timiryazev, Nikolay Umov, Peter Minakov, Alexander Manuilov, Mikhail Menzbier, Alexander Focht, Vasily Shervinsky, Witold Tseraski, Evgeny Trubetskoy; stand: Ivan Alexinsky, Vladimir Roth, Nikolay Zelinskiy, Pyotr Lebedev, Alexander Eikhenvald, Gabriel Shershenevich, Veniamin Khvostov, Alexander Alexeev, Fedor Rein, Dmitry Petrushevsky, Boleslav Mlodzeevskii, Vladimir Vernadsky, Sergei Chaplygin, Nikolay Davydov

In 1911, the conflict between the Ministry of Education, headed by Lev Kasso, and the University of Moscow resulted in the collective resignation of more than a third of the faculty, including many outstanding scientists. The immediate cause of the conflict was the decision of the student meeting in November 1910 on the occasion of the death of Leo Tolstoy about the termination for 3 days of classes in connection with mourning. The rector of Moscow University, according to the circular of the Minister of Education, banned the holding of meetings. However, the meetings continued. Minister of Education Lev Kasso demanded from the rector of Moscow University Alexander Manuilov to resolve the conflict by force. The Ministry publishes in January 1911 a circular "On temporary exclusion of public and private student institutions", which prohibits meetings at the university, which makes it obligatory for rectors to prevent unauthorized persons from entering the university and to report to the police about alleged gatherings; the mayor was charged with closing the university with the help of the police in case of unrest. The circular violated the provisions of the provisional rules of 1905, according to which the petition for the closure of the university belonged to the rights of the council.

The student meeting takes a decision on the strike. Immediately afterwards, police forces were introduced into the university, without the knowledge of the council, to prevent the beginning of the strike. Police actions paralyzed the training sessions. At an emergency meeting of the council, all the leaders of the Moscow University resigned. This decision was approved by the council. In response, the Ministry publishes the highest decree on the dismissal of university leaders, while at the same time prohibiting them from engaging in scientific and teaching activities. Cassault's decision caused a storm of resentment among professors and teachers of Moscow University. The first applications for resignation in March 1911 were submitted by teachers of the Faculty of Law. By the end of the semester, the university had left 131 people – about a third of the teaching staff of the university, among them – world-renowned scientists.

=== End of the era of the Imperial University ===
The Russian Revolution of 1917 had a direct impact on the life of Moscow University. From the beginning of 1917, university students participated in the activities of legal and illegal parties, went to street demonstrations, used the university for political demonstrations. In February 1917 in the classrooms there were continuous rallies. A lot of different organizations emerged: the health organization of medical students, who took on themselves the duty to help the wounded, the student militia, who distributed arms and declared herself independent of the university's administration. However, the voices of other students were also heard, especially at the Physics and Mathematics Faculty, which demanded the resumption of classes.

In March 1917, the rector of the Moscow University telegraphed to the Minister of Education: «The university encounters obstacles for the resumption of classes, for its audiences are occupied with the organization of student militia, which considers itself autonomous, arbitrarily occupies premises, rents them for rallies and requisition university property. Upon receipt of the Council, I petition for measures to clean the classrooms and some laboratories from these organizations and gatherings» (there was no reaction to the telegram).

After the abdication of Emperor Nicholas II from the name of the Imperial Moscow University, the word "Imperial" disappeared (the corresponding inscription was knocked down from the pediment of the main building of the university on Mokhovaya). In 1917, the university was simply called Moscow State University.

The revolutionary transformations of 1917–1921 in the sphere of Russian public education, which began in the first years of Soviet power, led to a complete change in the structure of the university, its teaching and student staff. The adopted policy of "democratization" and "proletarianization" of higher education led to a sharp increase in the number of students and, correspondingly, a decrease in the level of teaching. During the All-Russian competition (1919), many professors lost their seats at the university, whose views were assessed as counter-revolutionary. A number of eminent representatives of university science were expelled from Russia (1922).

== Chronology of main events ==
Timeline
- January 1755: Founding of the university.; 1787: Moving the university from the Aptekarskij dom building on Red Square to the Main Building on Mokhovaya Street.; 1804: Introduction of the University Statute of 1804.; 1812: French invasion of Russia. The loss of the university in the Moscow fire, buildings, museum collections, scientific equipment, library, archive, the death of many professors and students during the war. Evacuation to Nizhny Novgorod.; 1813: Resumption of training of university students in Moscow.; 1813–1819: Restoration of the Main Building of the university.; 1835: Introduction of the University Statute of 1835. Introduction of the Auditor Corps of the University on Mokhovaya Street.; 1863: Introduction of the University Statute of 1863. The most liberal of the university statutes of the Russian Empire, which returned autonomy to the university.; 1884: Introduction of the University Statute of 1884, which limits the autonomy of the university.; 1884–1897: Construction of the Clinical Town on the Devichye Pole, which included 13 clinics and 20 research institutes.; 1905: Introduction of the Provisional Regulations of 1905.; 1911: Conflict between the Ministry of Public Education and the Moscow University, which resulted in the collective resignation of more than a third of the faculty of the university.; February 1917: Renaming of the Imperial Moscow University to Moscow State University.

The directors and rectors of the university played an important role in its development.

== List of directors and rectors ==
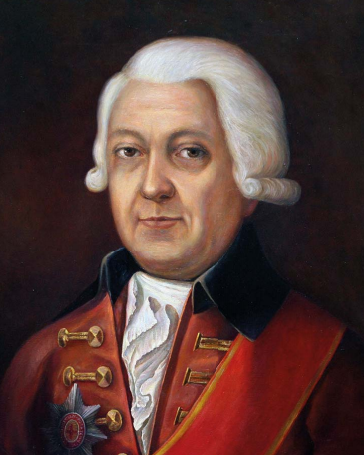
Ivan Melissino

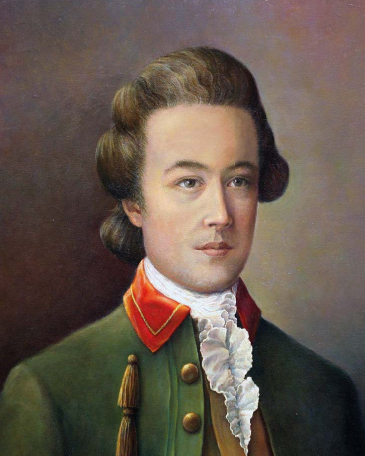
Ivan Turgenev

=== Directors (1755–1803) ===
- 1755–1757 Aleksey Argamakov
- 1757–1763 Ivan Melissino
- 1763–1770 Mikhail Kheraskov
- 1770–1771 Anton Teyls
- 1771–1784 Mikhail Priklonsky
- 1784–1796 Pavel Fonvizin
- 1796–1803 Ivan Turgenev

=== Rectors (1803–1917) ===
- 1803–1805 Khariton Chebotaryov
- 1805–1807 Pyotr Strakhov
- 1807–1808 Fyodor Bauze
- 1808–1819 Ivan Geym
- 1819–1826 Anton Antonsky-Prokopovich
- 1826–1833 Ivan Dvigubsky
- 1833–1836 Aleksey Boldyrev
- 1837–1842 Mikhail Kachenovsky
- 1842–1848 Arkady Alfonsky
- 1848–1850 Dmitry Perevoshchikov
- 1850–1863 Arkady Alfonsky
- 1863–1870 Sergey Barshev
- 1871–1877 Sergey Solovyov
- 1877–1883 Nikolai Tikhonravov
- 1883–1887 Nikolay Bogolepov
- 1887–1891 Gavriil Ivanov
- 1891–1893 Nikolay Bogolepov
- 1893–1898 Pavel Nekrasov
- 1898 Nikolay Zverev
- 1898–1899 Dmitry Zernov
- 1899–1904 Aleksandr Tikhomirov
- 1904–1905 Leonid Lakhtin
- 1905 Sergei Trubetskoy
- 1905–1911 Alexander Manuilov
- 1911–1917 Matvei Lyubavsky
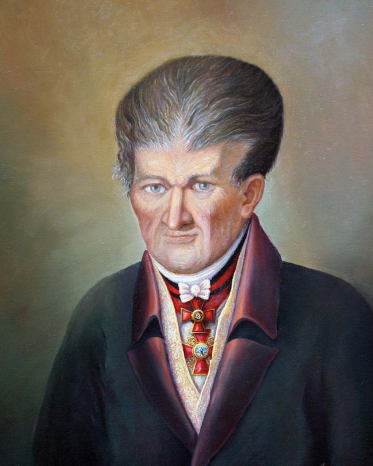
Ivan Game

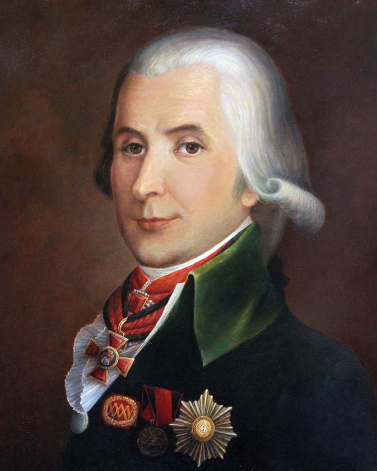
Anton Antonsky-Prokopovich

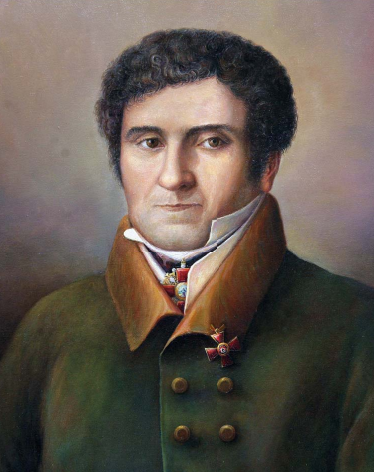
Ivan Dwigubski

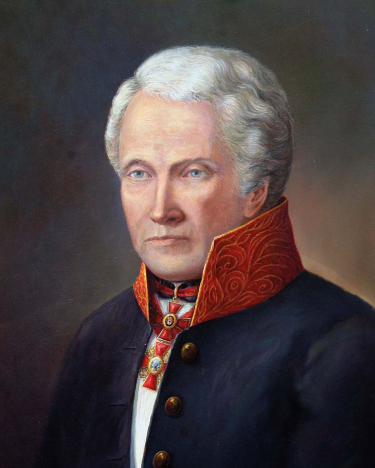
Mikhail Kachenovsky

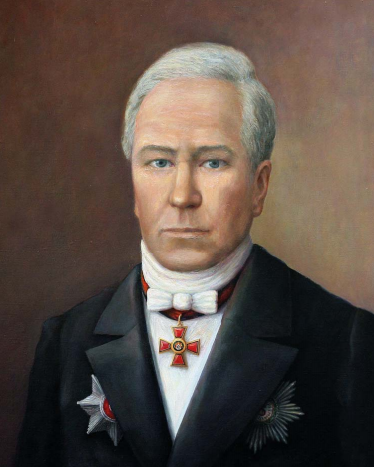
Arkady Alfonsky

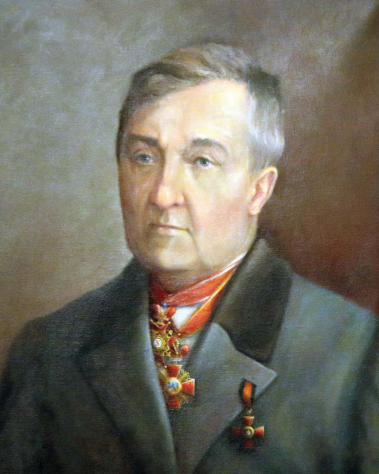
Dmitry Perevoshchikov

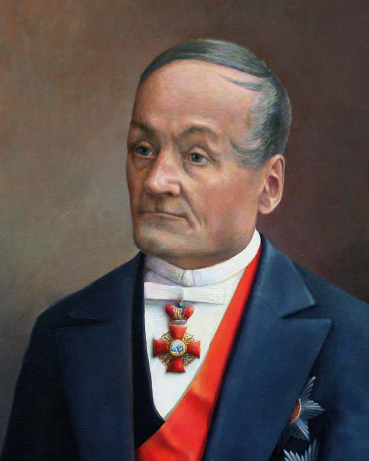
Sergey Barshev

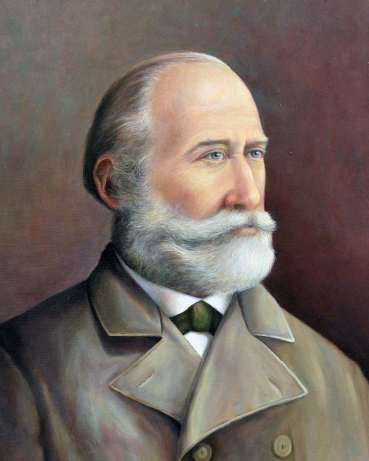
Sergey Solovyov

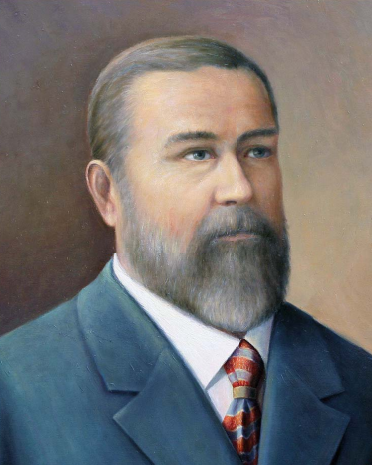
Nikolay Tikhonravov

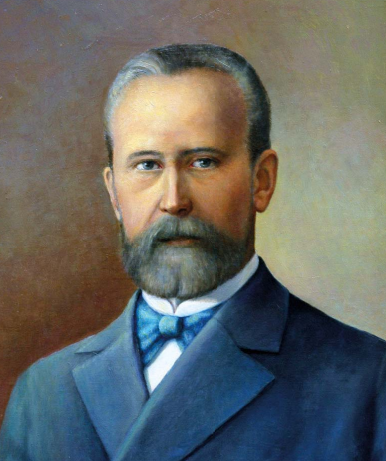
Nikolay Bogolepov

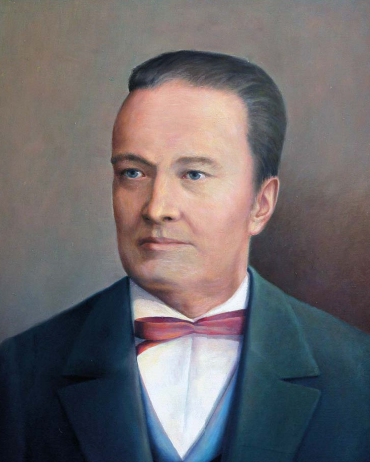
Gabriel Ivanov

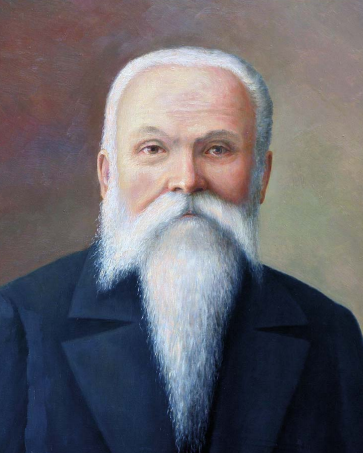
Pavel Nekrasov

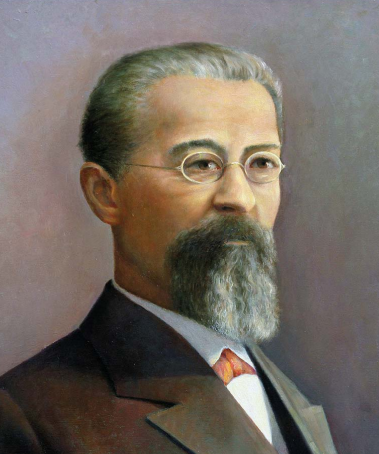
Nikolay Zverev

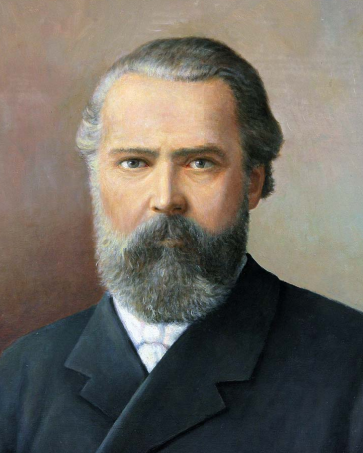
Dmitry Zernov

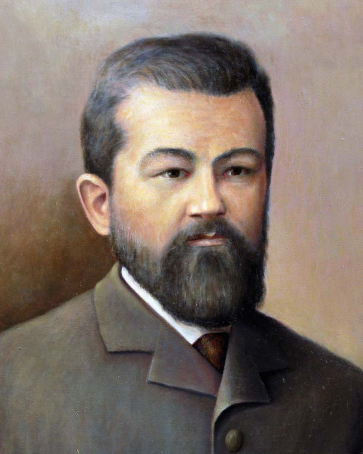
Aleksandr Tikhomirov

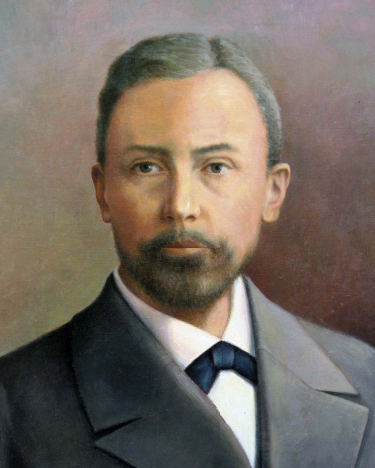
Leonid Lakhtin

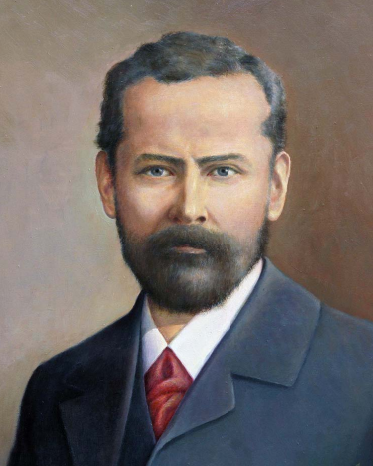
Sergei Trubetskoy

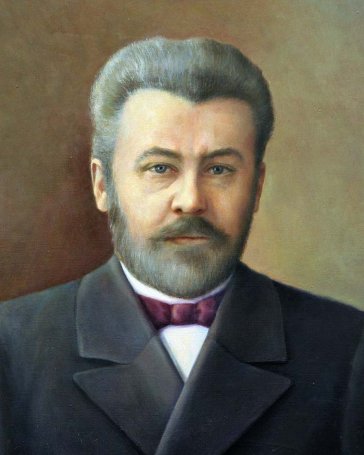
Alexander Manuilov

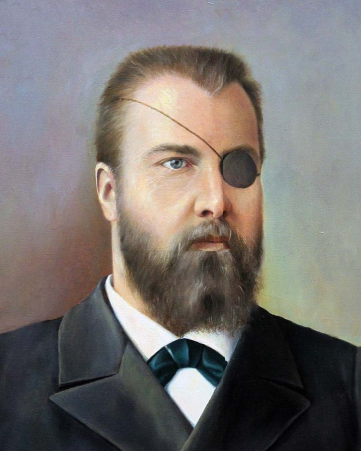
Matvey Lubavsky

== Personalities ==
- Category:Imperial Moscow University alumni
- Category:Academic staff of Imperial Moscow University

== Bibliography ==
- "Университет". Brockhaus and Efron Encyclopedic Dictionary: In 86 Volumes (82 Volumes and 4 Additional Volumes) (in Russian). St. Petersburg: F. A. Brockhaus. 1890–1907.
- "Университеты и другие высшие школы в 1902—1906 гг.". Brockhaus and Efron Encyclopedic Dictionary: In 86 Volumes (82 Volumes and 4 Additional Volumes) (in Russian). St. Petersburg: F. A. Brockhaus. 1890–1907.
- A. Andreev, D. Tsygankov Imperial Moscow University: 1755-1917: encyclopedic dictionary. Moscow: Russian political encyclopedia (ROSSPEN). 2010. ISBN 978-5-8243-1429-8.
