= Ivan Delyanov =

Russian statesman of Armenian descent

Ivan Davidovich Delyanov
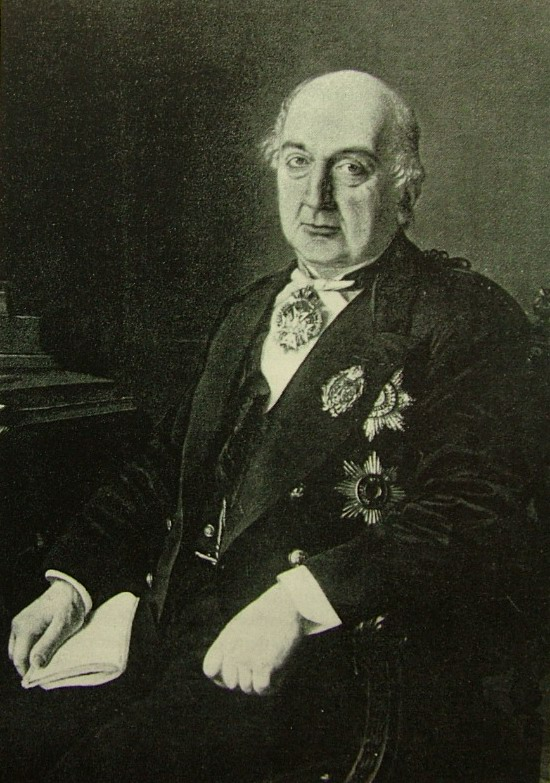
- Ivan Delyanov
- Born: November 30, 1818 (Julian calendar); Moscow, Moskovsky Uyezd, Moscow Governorate, Russian Empire
- Died: December 29, 1897 (aged 79) (Julian calendar); Saint Petersburg
- Education: Imperial Moscow University (1838)
- Occupation: statesman of the Russian Empire

Count Ivan Davidovich Delyanov (Russian: Ива́н Давы́дович Деля́нов) (December 12, 1818 in Moscow – January 10, 1898 using Gregorian dating) was a Russian statesman of Armenian descent and a son of Delyanov David Artemyevich, a Major-General of the Russian Imperial Army.

== Biography ==
Delyanov graduated from Moscow State University's Law School in 1838. In 1857 – 1897, he held a number of important governmental positions. Delyanov became a member of the State Council of Imperial Russia in 1874. In 1861 – 1882, he was a director of the National Library of Russia in St Petersburg. In 1882 – 1897, Delyanov held a post of the minister of public education. He introduced a new University charter in 1884, which would deprive universities of their former autonomy. Delyanov also closed down the universities for women (Bestuzhev Courses) in 1886.

On June 18, 1887, he issued a circular, which would limit the admittance of children of the non-noble origin to the gymnasiums. According to this document, gymnasiums and progymnasiums had to restrict the enrollment of children of people of lower classes.

The circular stated in part that the new rules free the gymnasiums from children of coachmen, lackeys, cooks, laundresses, petty merchants, with the possible exceptions for those endowed with extraordinary abilities, — all those who should not altogether be taken out the environment they belong to. For this reason it has become known as the Cookwomen's Children Circular (Циркуляр о кухаркиных детях). This discriminatory language was capitalized upon by Russian revolutionaries and was the base of the famous phrase of Vladimir Lenin that in the Soviet Union "even a cookwoman may manage the state".

Delyanov also introduced a certain percentage for accepting the Jews in educational institutions. National minority schools were subject to mandatory russification.

== Bibliography ==
- Imperial Moscow University: 1755-1917: encyclopedic dictionary. Moscow: Russian political encyclopedia (Rosspen). 2010. p. 212. ISBN 978-5-8243-1429-8 – via A. Andreev, D. Tsygankov.

| Preceded by Aleksandr Nicolai | Minister of National Enlightenment; 1882 – 1898 | Succeeded by Nikolay Bogolepov |
