= Zhitkov =

Zhitkov (Russian: Житков) is a Russian masculine surname; its feminine counterpart is Zhitkova. The surname originates either from an adjective zhidkii, which meant weak, poor in old Russian, or from zhitkii, meaning nimble, frisky. Notable people with the surname include:

- Boris Zhitkov (1882—1938), Russian writer
- Boris Mikhailovich Zhitkov (1872–1943), Russian and Soviet biogeographer, explorer, and writer
- Pavel Zhitkov (born 1984), Kazakhstani ice hockey goaltender
