= Nikolay Bogolepov =

Nikolay Pavlovich Bogolepov
- Николай Павлович Боголепов
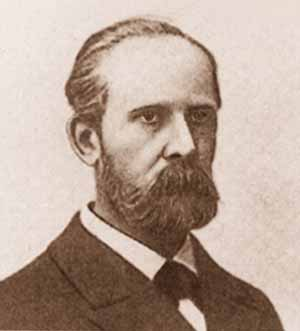

Minister of National Enlightenment
- In office 1898 – 27 February 1901
- Prime Minister: Ivan Durnovo
- Preceded by: Count Ivan Delyanov
- Succeeded by: Pyotr Vannovskiy

Personal details
- Born: 9 December 1846 Serpukhov, Moscow Governorate, Russian Empire
- Died: 15 March 1901 (aged 54) Saint Petersburg, Russian Empire
- Resting place: Dorohomilovskoye Cemetery
- Citizenship: Russian Empire
- Education: Doctor of Science (1881)
- Alma mater: Imperial Moscow University (1868)
- Occupation: statesman, rector

Academic background
- Thesis: Formal restrictions on the freedom of wills in Roman classical jurisprudence

Nikolay Pavlovich Bogolepov (Russian: Николай Павлович Боголепов) (9 December 1846 – 15 March 1901) was a Russian jurist and Minister of National Enlightenment. He was assassinated by a Socialist-Revolutionary activist.

== Student life ==
Bogolepov was born in Serpukhov, in the Moscow Governorate of the Russian Empire. His father was a police inspector. In 1857 he moved to Moscow to continue his education in secondary school because his father did not find a satisfactory one in Serpukhov. The father could not afford moving to Moscow himself and Bogolepov had to live alone in a school boarding house. In 1864 he finished the school and entered the Law faculty of the Moscow State University. After graduation he worked in the Criminal Department of the Senate but left it a year after and in 1869 returned to the University for academic studies in Roman law.

== Official life ==
Like many young students, Bogolepov was inclined towards revolutionary activity, but once he had been accepted by the establishment, he became "a mere tool in the hands of the Procurator of the Holy Synod".

Appointed professor in 1881, he was elected two years later as rector of the Moscow University where he continued lecturing in Roman law. In 1886, two of his children died in a row, and being unable to work at the University after this tragedy, Bogolepov resigned from his post. He was reappointed as rector in 1891 but resigned again two years later due to constant student unrest.

In 1895, the Minister of Popular Enlightenment Ivan Delyanov died, and Bogolepov was appointed by Nicholas II as his successor. He faced a huge number of problems, firstly student disturbances that ranged from typical protests and demands for autonomy for universities, to the use of revolutionary propaganda. The government introduced various restrictive measures, but this only made the situation worse. In 1896, according to Konstantin Pobedonostsev, Bogolepov was responsible for decreeing that students who participated in protests were to be drafted into the military.

In 1900, Minister of Finance Witte introduced "Temporary Regulations", according to which a university student could be conscripted into the army as a punishment for participation in student riots. Although not the author of this highly unpopular innovation, Bogolepov did approve of it, and at the beginning of 1901 he ordered the conscription of 183 students of Kiev University. On 27 February, he was shot in the neck by Pyotr Karpovich, a supporter of the Socialist-Revolutionary Party, and he died on 15 March. Karpovich was sentenced to twenty years of katorga. He escaped from prison after five years and died in 1917 when a ship with Russian émigrés was sunk by a German submarine.

== Bibliography ==
- Imperial Moscow University: 1755-1917: encyclopedic dictionary. Moscow: Russian political encyclopedia (ROSSPEN). 2010. pp. 84–85. ISBN 978-5-8243-1429-8 – via A. Andreev, D. Tsygankov.

| Preceded by Nikolay Tikhonravov | Rector of the Moscow University; 1883–1887 | Succeeded by Nikolay Tikhonravov |
| Preceded by Gavriil Ivanov | Rector of the Moscow University; 1893–1895 | Succeeded by Pavel Nekrasov |
| Preceded by Ivan Delyanov | Minister of National Enlightenment; 1898–1901 | Succeeded by Pyotr Vannovskiy |
