= Sadovnichy =

Sadovnichy (Russian: Садовничий, from садовник meaning gardener) is a Russian masculine surname. The feminine counterpart is Sadovnichaya. It may refer to:

- Ivan Sadownichy (born 1987), Belarusian football player
- Viktor Sadovnichiy (born 1939), Russian mathematician
