= Faculty of Fundamental Medicine, Moscow State University =

Medical school of Moscow State University

Faculty of Fundamental Medicine Moscow State University
- Факультет фундаментальной медицины МГУ (ФФМ МГУ)
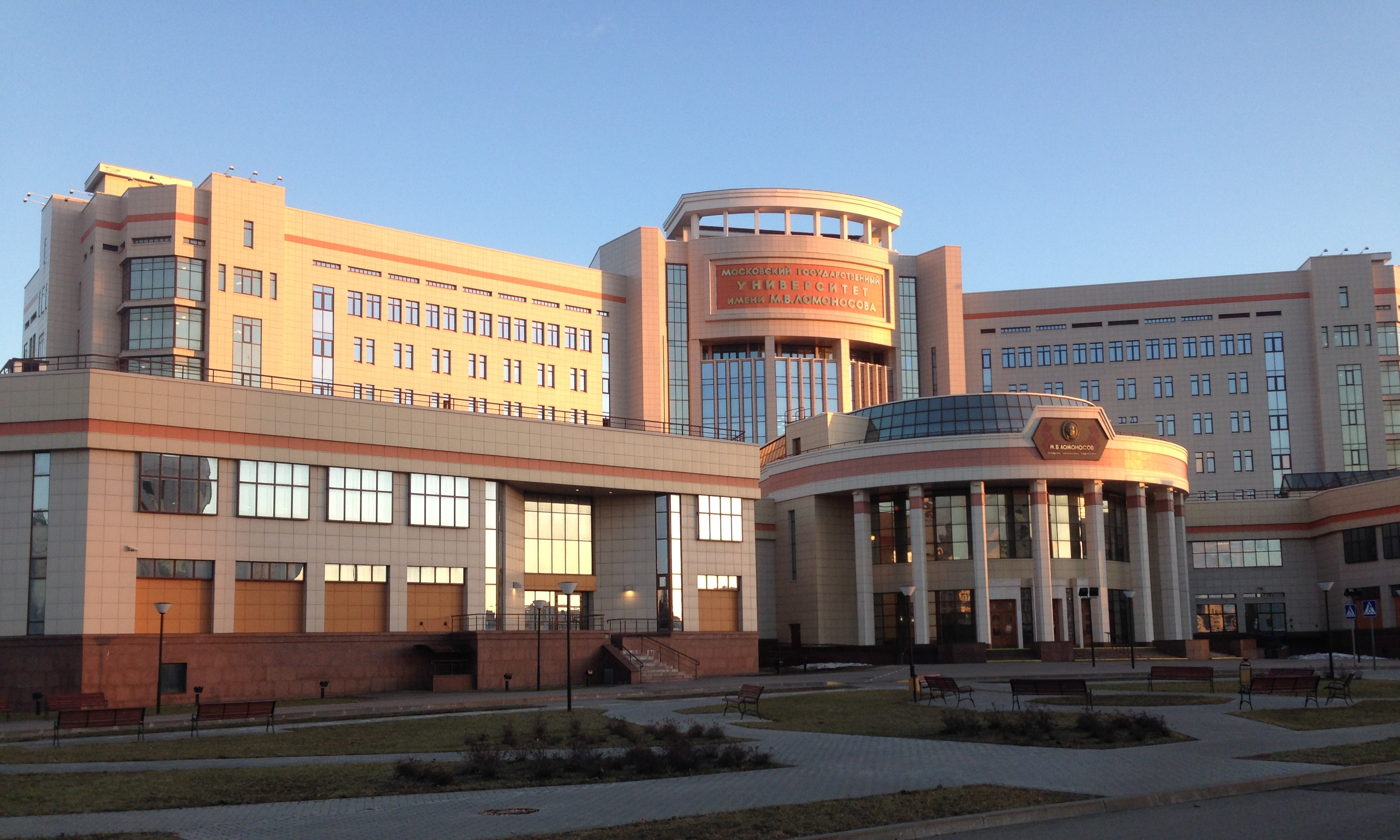
- Educational building of the Faculty of Fundamental Medicine
- Type: Public
- Established: 1992
- Rector: Viktor Sadovnichiy
- Dean: Vsevolod Tkachuk
- Location: Moscow, Russia
- Campus: Urban
- Website: www.fbm.msu.ru

Faculty of Fundamental Medicine (FFM MSU; Russian: Факультет фундаментальной медицины) is the medical faculty of Moscow State University. Established on 1 July 1992, it has been headed since 2000 by Academician Vsevolod Tkachuk.

Since 2025, the Faculty has been part of the Medical Research and Educational Institute of Moscow State University (MREI MSU), together with the University Clinic and the Centre for Regenerative Medicine.

The Faculty combines medical education, biomedical research and clinical training. It collaborates with research institutes of the Russian Academy of Sciences, medical institutions of the Ministry of Health of the Russian Federation, university hospitals and other clinical centres. Many departments are based at leading research institutes and specialised medical centres, including the Research Centre of Surgery, the Cardiology Research Centre, the Oncology Research Centre, the P. A. Hertsen Moscow Oncology Research Institute, the P. A. Priorov National Medical Research Centre of Traumatology and Orthopedics, the P. K. Anokhin Research Institute of Normal Physiology, the Research Institute of Forensic Medicine, the Endocrinology Research Centre, the Research Institute of Phthisiopulmonology, and the Martsinovsky Institute of Medical Parasitology, Tropical and Vector-Borne Diseases.

The Faculty offers undergraduate programmes in General Medicine (M.D.) and Pharmacy, as well as postgraduate residency and doctoral (Ph.D.) programmes.

== History ==
Moscow State University was founded on 25 January 1755 by a decree of Empress Elizabeth of Russia on the initiative of the scientist Mikhail Lomonosov. From its foundation, the University comprised three faculties: Philosophy, Jurisprudence and the Medical Faculty.

Medical education at Moscow University began in 1758. During the nineteenth century, the Medical Faculty developed into one of the leading centres of medical education and biomedical research in the Russian Empire. In 1930, it was separated from Moscow State University and reorganised as the First Moscow Medical Institute, now the First Moscow State Medical University.

After more than six decades without a medical faculty, the Faculty of Fundamental Medicine was established on 1 July 1992 by order of the Rector of Moscow State University, Academician Viktor Sadovnichiy, to restore university medical education and integrate medical training with fundamental biomedical research.

Since its establishment, the Faculty has developed into one of Russia's leading centres of medical education and biomedical research. Clinical training is provided at the University Clinic and in cooperation with major research institutes and medical centres in Moscow.

In 2025, following the reorganisation of the University's medical complex, the Faculty became part of the Medical Research and Educational Institute of Moscow State University (MREI MSU), together with the University Clinic and the Centre for Regenerative Medicine.

== Departments ==
The Faculty comprises the following departments:

- Obstetrics and Gynecology
- Anesthesiology and Intensive Care
- Biochemistry and Molecular Medicine
- Internal medicine
- Medical Biophysics
- Clinical Simulation and Manual Skills
- Multidisciplinary Clinical Training
- Normal and Topographical Anatomy
- General and Specialised Surgery
- Ophthalmology
- Therapy
- Urology and Andrology
- Pharmacology
- Pharmaceutical Technology
- Pharmaceutical chemistry, Pharmacognosy and Pharmaceutical Management
- Physiology and General Pathology
- Surgery
- Ecological and Extreme Medicine
- Diagnostic Radiology and Therapy

The departments provide undergraduate, postgraduate and doctoral education, conduct research in biomedical science, and participate in clinical training at the University Clinic and affiliated research and medical institutions.

== Recent developments ==
The establishment of the University Clinic between 2007 and 2015 significantly expanded the Faculty's educational, clinical and research capabilities by providing its own clinical base for undergraduate, postgraduate and continuing medical education, as well as for biomedical research.

A major milestone in the Faculty's development took place in 2025, when the University's medical complex was reorganised into the Medical Research and Educational Institute of Moscow State University (MREI MSU). The Faculty of Fundamental Medicine became one of the Institute's three principal divisions, together with the University Clinic and the Centre for Regenerative Medicine. The reorganisation strengthened the integration of medical education, clinical practice and biomedical research within Moscow State University.

=== Centre for Regenerative Medicine ===
The Centre for Regenerative Medicine traces its origins to the Institute of Regenerative Medicine, established at Moscow State University in 2016 as Russia's first university centre dedicated to regenerative medicine. In 2025, following the establishment of the Medical Research and Educational Institute of Moscow State University (MREI MSU), the Institute was renamed the Centre for Regenerative Medicine.

The Centre is directed by Konstantin Kulebyakin, while its scientific supervision is provided by Academician Vsevolod Tkachuk.

Its research focuses on regenerative medicine, gene therapy, cell therapy, tissue engineering, molecular endocrinology, regenerative biology and translational medicine. The Centre includes laboratories of Molecular Endocrinology, Medical Bioengineering, Tissue Repair and Regeneration, and Genetic Diagnostics.

Since 2023, the Centre has operated a licensed research and manufacturing facility compliant with GMP standards for the development and production of biomedical, gene- and cell-therapy products, supporting the translation of laboratory discoveries into clinical applications.

== Short-term programs ==
The Faculty offers a range of short-term educational programmes for international students.

== Collaboration ==
The faculty is in internationally collaboration with:

- Tohoku University (Sendai, Japan)
- Humboldt University of Berlin (Germany)
- Regensburg University (Germany)
- National Institutes of Health (United States)
- State University of New York (United States)
- George Mason University (Virginia, United States)
- Central Clinical Hospital (CKB) under the Administration of the President of Russian Federation
- I.M.Sechenov Moscow Medical Academy
