= Evgeni Pavlovich Spangenberg =

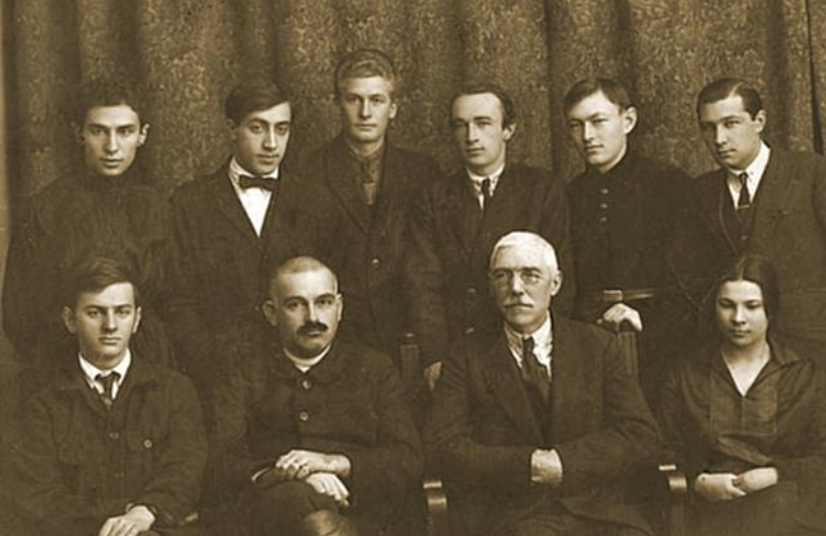
Student years, Seated third from left Professor B. M. Zhitkov. Standing left to right, G.A. Feigin, unidentified, S.P. Naumov, E.P. Spangenberg and others

Evgeni Pavlovich Spangenberg (25 February 1898 – 25 July 1968) was a Soviet ornithologist and the author of several popular natural history books.

== Life and work ==
Spangenberg was born in Andrianovka (in modern Chita Oblast) and because his father Pavel worked in the railways, there was much travel and he grew up in St Petersburg and then Akhtuba in the Lower Volga region where the rich steppe wildlife made him interested in birds and hunting. He graduated from the Irkutsk Gymnasium and moved to Ukraine, working in the railway workshops in Zaporozhye before he joined the Red Army in 1919. After demobilization in 1921, with the loss of hearing in one ear, he joined Moscow University in 1922, graduated in 1930 after nearly being expelled (and being helped by A.F. Kots and others) and then became a researcher. In 1944 he became an associate professor at the Lomonosov State University. He was also in charge of the Zoological Museum. He learned taxidermy from August Karlovich Tselmin. He went on several expeditions including to Central Asia, southern Kazakhstan and Lower Syr Darya where he studied bird life.

Spangenberg suffered from poor health after the 1950s and produced five volumes of the Birds of the Soviet Union (1951) for which he was awarded a Stalin Prize in 1952. He also published several other books including an autobiographical book Записки натуралиста ("Notes of a Naturalist").

He committed suicide in 1968. He is buried in the Vaganskovo cemetery, Moscow. He was married to Ekaterina Innokentyevna (4 March 1908 – 8 November 1996) and they had a son Eugene (20 March 1935 – 12 September 1996) and a daughter Maria (31 December 1943 – 3 July 2001).
