= Boris Mikhailovich Zhitkov =

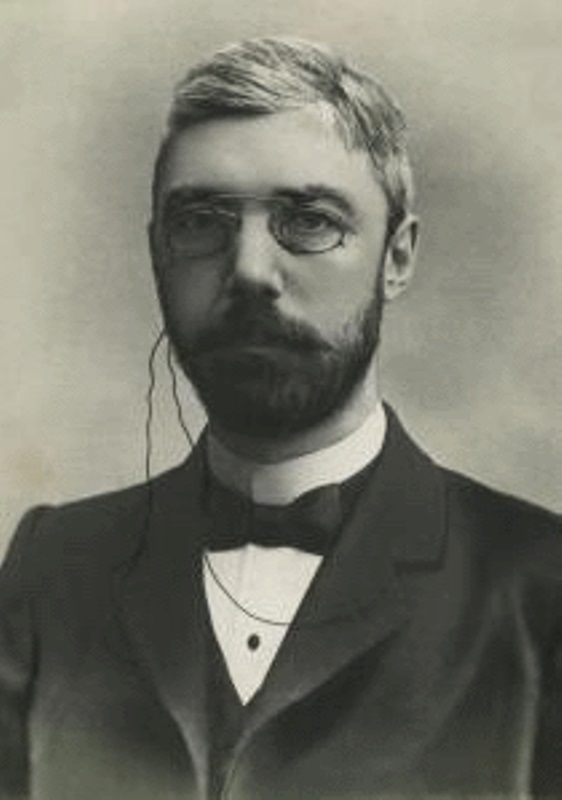

Boris Mikhailovich Zhitkov (Russian: Борис Михайлович Житков; 20 September 1872 – 2 April 1943) was a Russian and Soviet explorer, zoologist, hunter, biogeographer, and writer. He served as a professor at Moscow University and at the Petrovsky Agricultural Academy. He established a biological research station where many founding figures of Soviet zoology were trained. It is now called the B.M. Zhitkov Russian Research Institute of Game Management and Fur Farming.

== Biography ==
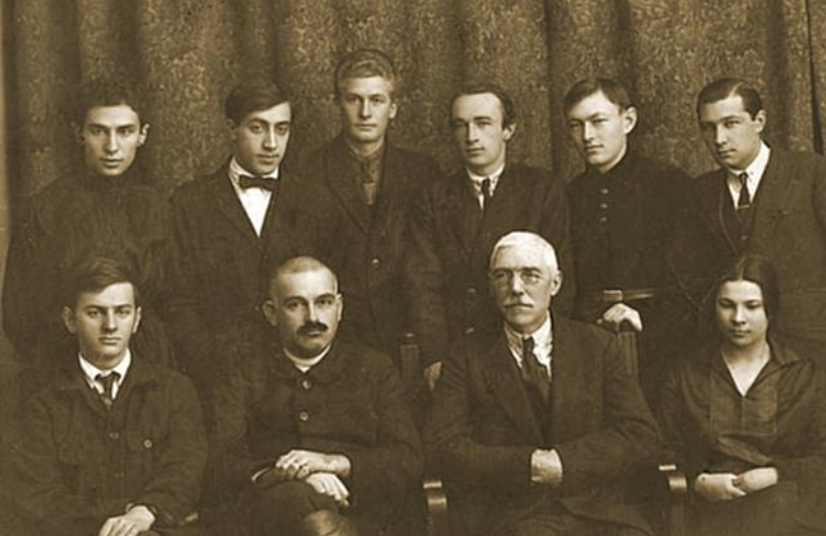
Zoology students at Moscow. Seated third from left Professor B. M. Zhitkov. Standing left to right, G.A. Feigin, unidentified, S.P. Naumov, E. P. Spangenberg and others

Zhitkov was born in Ardatov and came from an impoverished family of noble origins. His grandfather had taken part in the Patriotic War of 1812 and risen to the rank of major general. His father Mikhail Ivanovich was a military engineer who had seen action at Sevastopol during the Crimean War (1853-1856). His mother Irina was the daughter of Y. P. Bartenev. Boris graduated from the Alatyr gymnasium in 1886 and the Nizhny Novgorod Noble Institute in 1890. He then went to Moscow University where he studied under A. P. Bogdanov and A. A. Tikhomirov. He travelled to the White Sea in 1893 and became a friend of S. A. Buturlin with whom he travelled several times. In 1902 and 1908 he led expeditions of the Russian Geographical Society to the Kanin and Yamal peninsulas. He was a keen hunter and had an interest in nature conservation from a hunting perspective. In 1909 he spoke on the need for reducing so called "harmful animals" listed in the law. In 1919 he helped establish the Astrakhan Nature Reserve was organized. From 1919 to 1921 he lived in Alatyr and helped organize the Alatyr Institute of Natural History along with Buturlin. In 1921 he became a part-time professor at The Timiryazev Academy of Moscow University. In 1922 he founded a biological station at Losino-Ostrovsky (Losino-Pogonny Island) where he employed several of his students including B. A. Kuznetsov, N. P. Lavrov, E. P. Spangenberg, S. P. Naumov, A. N. Formozov, D. N. Danilov, P. B. Yurgenson, N. K. Vereshchagin, S. S. Folitarek, I. Yu. Zhitkova, S. F. Chirkova, V. G. Stakhrovsky, N. P. Naumov, A. P. Razorenova, S. V. Lobachev, D. M. Vyazhlinsky, L. I. Girshfeld, V. G. Geptner, S. I. Ognev, G. L. Grave, and Ya. P. Shchelkanovtsev at various points in time.

Zhitkov wrote several books on nature conservation and wrote a popular science book on bird flight. He was also involved in the introduction of animals (then termed acclimatization) for fur including the muskrat and nutria (1928-1932).

Zhitkov fell ill during the bombing of Moscow in 1943 and died at the Sklifosovsky hospital.
