= Medical faculty of Moscow University =

Russian edical school (1755–1930)

- Медицинский факультет Московского университета
- Type: Medical faculty
- Active: 1755–1930
- Parent institution: Imperial Moscow University (1755–1917); Moscow State University (1917–1930)
- Location: Moscow, Russian Empire (1755–1917); Soviet Union (1917–1930)

Medical faculty of Moscow University was the medical faculty of Imperial Moscow University and, after 1917, Moscow State University. Established together with the university in 1755, it was the first university medical faculty in Russia. During the nineteenth century it became one of the country's leading centres of medical education and biomedical research. In 1930 it was separated from Moscow State University and reorganised as the First Moscow Medical Institute, the predecessor of the present-day First Moscow State Medical University.Following the Russian Revolution of 1917, the Faculty continued to operate as part of Moscow State University. In 1930, as part of the Soviet reorganisation of higher education, it was separated from the University and transformed into the First Moscow Medical Institute. This institution later became the First Moscow State Medical University.

== History ==
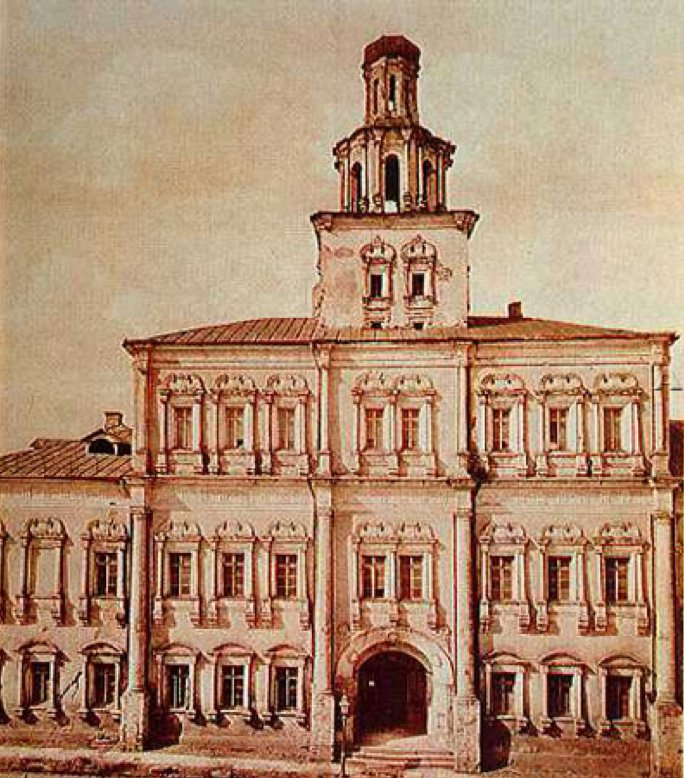
The Principal Medicine Store, where lectures of the Medical Faculty were held in the early years of Moscow University

The Medical Faculty was founded simultaneously with Moscow University by the decree of Elizabeth of Russia establishing the university on 25 January (12 January O.S.) 1755. Together with the faculties of philosophy and law, it formed one of the University's three original faculties.

Regular medical teaching began in 1758. In its early years instruction relied heavily on invited foreign physicians and professors, reflecting the general development of higher medical education in the Russian Empire. During the late eighteenth and nineteenth centuries the Faculty gradually expanded its teaching programmes, laboratories and clinical training.

Throughout the nineteenth century the Faculty became one of the principal centres of university medical education in Russia. Its professors made significant contributions to anatomy, physiology, pathology, surgery, internal medicine, obstetrics and other branches of medical science. Many prominent physicians, researchers and teachers of Russian medicine were associated with the Faculty.

Following the Russian Revolution of 1917, the Faculty continued to operate as part of Moscow State University. In 1930, as part of the Soviet reorganisation of higher education, it was separated from the University and transformed into the First Moscow Medical Institute. This institution later became the First Moscow State Medical University.

== Organization ==
The Faculty developed from a small teaching unit into one of the largest medical schools in the Russian Empire. By the beginning of the twentieth century it included numerous departments, laboratories, museums and affiliated teaching clinics.

Its academic activities covered both pre-clinical and clinical disciplines, including anatomy, physiology, pathology, pharmacology, surgery, internal medicine, obstetrics and gynaecology, paediatrics, hygiene and forensic medicine.

== Legacy ==
The Medical Faculty played a central role in the development of university medical education in Russia. Many of its graduates and professors became leading physicians, scientists, educators and organisers of healthcare.

Its traditions were continued after 1930 by the First Moscow Medical Institute, now the First Moscow State Medical University, while the medical tradition within Moscow State University was revived in 1992 with the establishment of the Faculty of Fundamental Medicine, Moscow State University.

== Notable alumni ==
- Anton Chekhov – writer and physician; graduated from the Faculty in 1884.
- Pyotr Gannushkin – psychiatrist and one of the founders of Russian clinical psychiatry.
- Sergei Korsakoff – psychiatrist, known for describing Korsakoff syndrome.
- Nikolay Pirogov – surgeon, anatomist and founder of field surgery.
- Ivan Sechenov – physiologist, often regarded as the founder of Russian physiology.
- Nikolay Sklifosovsky – surgeon and one of the founders of Russian clinical surgery.

== See also ==
- Imperial Moscow University
- Moscow State University
- First Moscow State Medical University
- Faculty of Fundamental Medicine, Moscow State University
