= Pavel Fonvizin =

Russian educator

Pavel Ivanovich Fonvizin (29 May 1746 – 24 April 1803 in Moscow) was a Russian educator, scholar, and writer, who served as Rector for the Imperial Moscow University from 1784 to 1796. He was the younger brother of playwright Denis Fonvizin, and son of state councillor Ivan Fonvizin.
