= Vsevolod Tkachuk =

Soviet and Russian biochemist (born 1946)

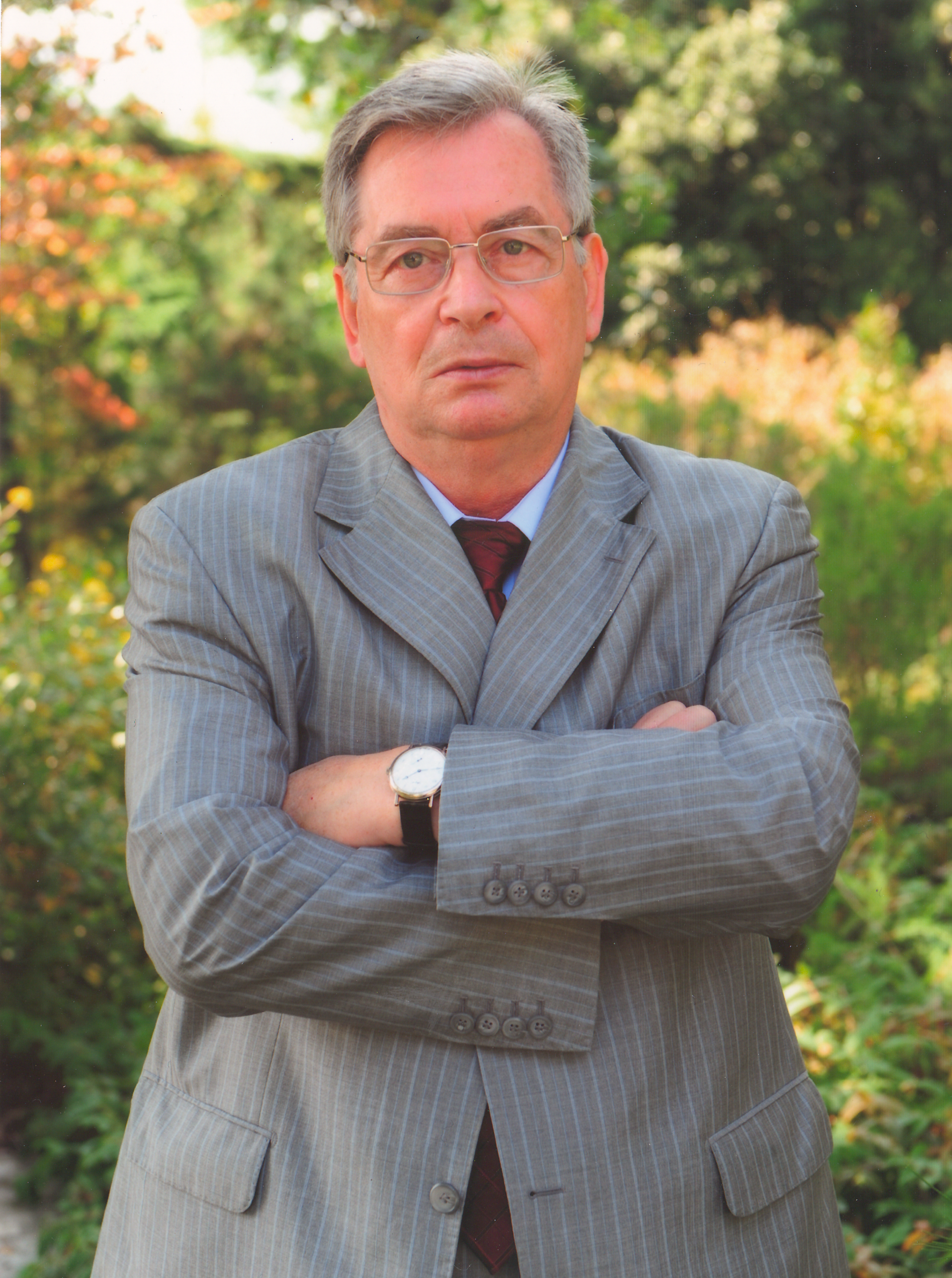
- Born: 19 December 1946 (age 79); Biysk, Altai Krai, Russian SFSR, Soviet Union
- Education: Doctor of Science (1986); Professor (1988); Academician of the Russian Academy of Sciences (2006)
- Alma mater: MSU Faculty of Biology
- Awards: Order of Honour (2005); Order of Friendship (2012)
- Scientific career
- Fields: Biology
- Workplaces: MSU Faculty of Fundamental Medicine Russian cardiological research and production complex
- Thesis: Biochemical mechanisms of regulation of adenylate cyclase system of the heart
- Doctoral advisor: Sergey Severin

Vsevolod Arsenyevich Tkachuk (Russian: Все́волод Арсе́ньевич Ткачу́к; born 19 December 1946) is a Soviet and Russian biochemist. He is an Academician of the Russian Academy of Medical Sciences (since 2000) and of the Russian Academy of Sciences (since 2006).

Since 2000, he has served as Dean of the MSU Faculty of Fundamental Medicine at Lomonosov Moscow State University. He is the Scientific Director of the Center for Regenerative Medicine at Lomonosov Moscow State University and has served as President of the Russian Society for Regenerative Medicine since 2018.

His research focuses on receptor biology and intracellular signal transduction, gene and cell therapy, stem cell biology, and regenerative medicine.

According to Scopus, Tkachuk's publications in Russian and international peer-reviewed scientific journals have been cited more than 9,000 times, and his h-index is 45.

== Biography ==
After graduating middle school with honors in 1965, he entered the Faculty of biology and soil science of Lomonosov Moscow State University.

Graduated the animal biochemistry Department of the Faculty of biology and soil science of MSU with honors in 1970.

Worked at the Department of animal biochemistry of the Faculty of biology of MSU from 1973 till 1982, where in the year of 1974 he defended his PhD thesis “Na+, K+-activated, Mg2+-dependent - sarcoplasmic ATP-ase” under direction of academician S. E. Severin and A. A. Boldyrev.

In 1982 organized a molecular endocrinology laboratory at the All-Union cardiological research center of AMS USSR, where he was invited to by E. I. Chazov. V. A. Tkachuk is head of this laboratory to this day.

In 1986 defended his doctoral thesis on the topic “Biochemical mechanisms of heart adenylate-cyclase system”. Was elected as a professor in 1988.

In 1992 organized a Department of biological and medical chemistry at the Faculty of fundamental medicine of MSU. He is the head of this department to this day, while also being the head of gene and cellular technology research laboratory.

In 1994 was elected as a corresponding member of RAMS, in 1997 – a corresponding member of RAS. An academician of RAMS since 2000, and an academician of RAS since 2006.

In 2000 was elected as a dean of the Faculty of fundamental medicine of MSU, and maintains this position to this day.

In 2015 was elected as the President of National regenerative medicine society, replacing the founding president, a RAS academician G.T. Suhih, at the seat. V.A. Tkachuk is heading the “Regenerative Medicine” platform as a member of the science council of the Ministry of Health.

Since 2016 is the Director of the newly created Lomonosov MSU regenerative medicine institute.

== Scientific achievements ==
=== Studies of mechanisms of hormonal regulation and intracellular signaling ===
In the early 70s, while working at the Department of animal biochemistry of the Faculty of biology at MSU, Tkachuk published his first papers on the mechanisms of membrane hormone receptors functioning (glucagon, adrenaline and histamine), regulation of synthesis and hydrolysis cAMP by adenylate-cyclase and phosphoesterase. This research was conducted under the guidance of the department founder, academician S. E. Severin, and became a pioneering research not only in the USSR, but in the whole world. Tkachuk and his coauthors are also credited research priority on determining the mechanisms of inhibition and activation of adenylate-cyclase by adenylyl nucleotides and nucleosides.

In the 80s, as the head of molecular endocrinology lab of the All-Union cardiological research center, Tkachuk and his colleagues researched the role of various G-proteins in adenylate-cyclase activity regulation and Ca^{2+}- dependent channels in myocardium, vessel, endothelial, smooth muscle cells and platelets. This research determined the molecular mechanisms of G-proteins’ influence on the development of both cell hypersensitivity and cell tolerance to catecholamine and medication. It was revealed that cell hormone sensitivity deviation developed alongside hypertension, ischemia or myocardial infarction.

In the same period, more research under Tkachuk's direction determined the mechanism of hypoxia's influence on cell's hormone sensitivity. It was revealed that during hypoxia phosphoinositide signaling is activated in endothelial cells, which leads to the activation of protein kinase C triggering the endocytosis of b-adrenergic receptors, which in turn leads to the cells developing insensitivity to catecholamines. During deep hypoxia and anoxia ATF- and ADF- hydrolyzing ferments disappear from the surface of endothelial cells, which leads to enhanced aggregation of platelets and endothelium hormone secretion.

In the 90s, a group directed by Tkachuk published a number of papers on stretching receptors’ involvement in specific regulation of gene expression in vessel cells. It was demonstrated that when a single smooth muscle cell is rhythmically stretched, it shows increased expression of a number of genes (caldesmon, calponin, α-actine, smooth muscle myosin), along with increased proliferation ability.

=== Discovery and research of T-Cadherin functions ===
In the early of the 90s, while studying blood cells, Tkachuk and his colleagues discovered that calcium ions get mobilized in platelets under the influence of lipoproteins, which leads to their aggregation. This effect is more pronounced under the influence of adrenaline. Around the same time it was discovered that Ca^{2+} is mobilized in smooth muscle cells (SMC) under the influence of angiotensin and endothelin. Using a SMC culture more fitting for experiments, the researchers managed to demonstrate that low density lipoproteins are capable of stimulating Ca^{2+} to exit endoplasmic reticulum. This effect occurs without involving the classic ApoB/E receptor (Goldstein and Brown received a Nobel prize in 1986 for discovering the ApoB/E receptor). To identify this new lipoprotein-binding receptor, it was purified and segregated. After that it was classified as T-Cadherin – a protein from the group of cadherins responsible for hemophilic intracellular interaction. During further research Tkachuk and his colleagues found out that unlike the other classical cadherins (N-, E-, VE- cadherin), T-cadherin does not bypass intracellular adhesion, but instead causes the cells to repel each other and is involved in the cell migration and cytoskeleton restructuring.

Further research revealed that T-cadherin is a navigational receptor what helps migrating cells and growing blood vessels avoid certain tissues and that linking lipoproteins with T-cadherin can disrupt angiogenesis and affect heart and vessel remodeling. It was later determined that T-cadherin expressed in endothelial cells is able to regulate endothelium permeability and is part of tumor angiogenesis and growth, as well as melanoma metastasis.

=== Research of the biological functions of urokinase-type plasminogen activator (uPA) ===
Since early 90s Tkachuk and his colleagues (E. V. Parfyonova, R. Sh. Bibilashvili, S. P. Domogatskiy, A. Bobik and others) have been studying the molecular mechanisms of blood vessel growth. In particular, a lot of research was focused on the role of urokinase-type plasminogen activator (Urokinase, uPA) in angiogenesis and vessel remodeling.

It was revealed that an increased expression of uPA and its receptor (uPAR) occurred in damaged vessel cells. This process was accompanied by increased taxis of smooth muscle cells and fibroblasts, as well as narrowing of the lumen of the vessel, but if the uPA was suppressed by counteractive antibodies, the intensity of this process was reduced. It turned out that enhanced expression of uPA caused proliferation of vessel cells and stimulated the synthesis of oxidative stress and inflammation proteins.

Tkachuk and his colleagues have also for the first time showed urokinase's ability to transport itself into the core and interact with transcriptional factors that regulate the proliferation of fibroblasts and their transformation into myofibroblasts. The latest research showed that the urokinase system in the vessels was necessary for determining the growth and branching trajectory of the capillaries, i.e. it performs a navigational function.

Tkachuk's research has revealed some interesting results regarding the role of uPA in directional cell migration. It was determined that uPA connects with uPAR and this complex concentrates on the leading edge of the cell - on the surface that is closest to the chemoattractant. Later research on uPA's significance in migration processes revealed that its concentration on the leading edge of the cell allows for local destruction of matrix proteins and facilitates migration. This process is realized through activation of plasminogen and starting fibrinolysis, as well as through the stimulating effect uPA has on MMP-2 and MMP-9 expression and activity.

These results formed the basis of the development of a drug for therapeutic angiogenesis via uPA gene delivery to the tissues affected by ischemia, as well the creation of the “Upicor” – a drug used to treat chronic ischemia of lower limbs.

=== Research of the role of mesenchyme stem cells in tissue regeneration ===
Tkachuk directs active research on the mechanisms of physiological renewal, tissue and organ regeneration and reparation, as well as the role of mesenchyme stem cells (MSC) of various tissues in this process. It was discovered that MSC is able to induce blood vessel and nerve growth during damaged tissues recovery. It was also revealed that the stimulating effect these cells have is caused not only by their secretion of soluble proteins (growth factors, cytokines and chemokines), but also by their secretion of extracellular vesicles. During the ascertainment of the mechanisms of MSC's effects on tissue regeneration and reparation, active study was being conducted on the effects hypoxia and inflammation occurring alongside many diseases have on biological activity of this kind of cells. It was discovered that angiogenic factor production in MSC is activated under the effects of hypoxia, and that cells produce immunomodulating cytokines (including immunosuppressant cytokines) under the conditions of inflammation. The results of this research opens up new approaches for treatments of infection and systemic disease, as well as organ and tissue transplantation.

A line of gene therapy drugs was developed on the basis of fundamental research conducted under Tkachuk's direction. These drugs are designed to stimulate blood vessel growth and peripheral nerves recovery after trauma.

Tkachuk is the author or co-author of more than 440 scientific papers, 45 patents and more than 29 books and monographs. He has supervised 15 Doctors of Sciences and 36 Candidates of Sciences.

== Teaching career ==
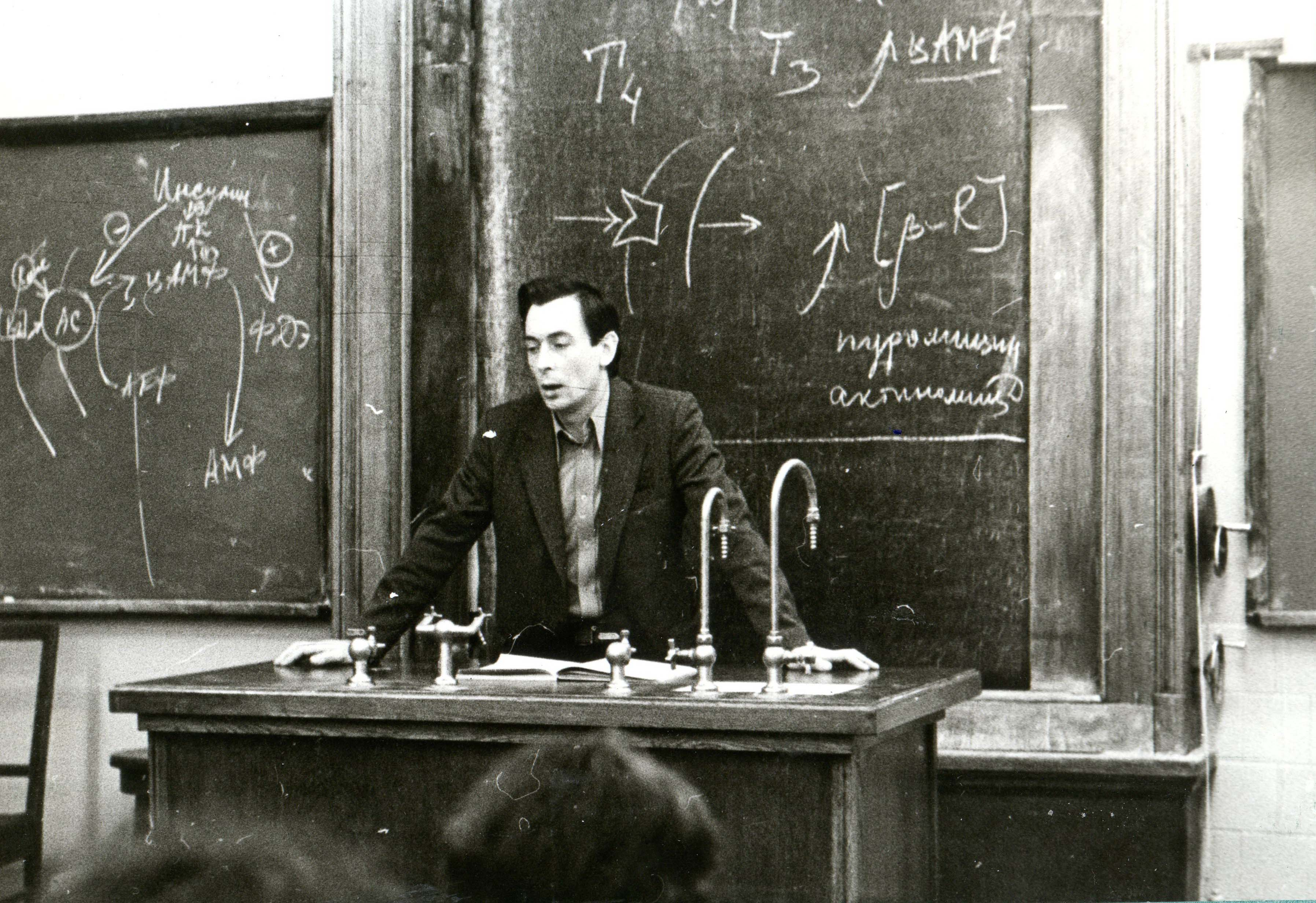
Tkachuk during a lecture on molecular nanomedicine.

During his work at the Department of animal biochemistry in the 70s, Tkachuk created a training course – “Molecular endocrinology”. This course is to this day studied by the students of the Faculty of biology of MSU.

Tkachuk has over 40 years of teaching experience and is the founder of the Department of biochemistry and molecular medicine at Lomonosov MSU (1992). He is overseeing the classes at the Faculty of fundamental medicine on the subjects “Biochemistry” and “Molecular biology”. Under his guidance, the lectures are delivered by the department workers and the leading specialists from the Faculty of biology, such as professor N. B. Gusev and others.

Tkachuk has edited five specialized textbooks aimed at the students of higher education in biology and medicine.

== Awards and honors ==
- Two times a laureate of Russian Federation Government Prize
- Order of Honor (2005)
- MSU Lomonosov Prize I degree for the series of works «Molecular mechanisms of growth and vascular remodeling» (2006)
- Order of Friendship (2012)

== Editorial activities ==
Tkachuk has served on the editorial boards or editorial councils of several scientific journals:

- Editor-in-chief of Regeneration of Organs and Tissues.
- Deputy editor-in-chief and member of the editorial board of the Journal of Evolutionary Biochemistry and Physiology.
- Member of the editorial board of the Russian Journal of Physiology.
- Member of the editorial board of the Bulletin of the Union of Physiological Societies of the CIS.
- Member of the editorial board of Cell and Tissue Biology.
- Member of the editorial board of Cardiology Bulletin.
- Member of the editorial council of Biological Membranes.
- Member of the editorial council of Acta Naturae.
- Member of the editorial council of Cell Technologies in Biology and Medicine.
- Member of the editorial council of Technologies of Living Systems.
- Member of the editorial council of the Russian Journal of Transplantology and Artificial Organs.
- Member of the editorial council of Molecular Medicine.

== Selected works ==
- Tkachuk, V. A. (1983). Introduction to Molecular Endocrinology (in Russian). Moscow: Moscow University Press.
- Brody, J. S.; Center, D. M.; Tkachuk, V. A. (1993). Signal Transduction in Lung Cells. New York: Marcel Dekker. ISBN 0-8247-8813-3.
- Avdonin, P. V.; Tkachuk, V. A. (1994). Receptors and Intracellular Calcium (in Russian). Moscow: Nauka.
- Tkachuk, V. A. (2004). Clinical Biochemistry (in Russian). Moscow: GEOTAR-Media. ISBN 5-9231-0420-2.
- Tkachuk, V. A. (2014). Stem Cells and Regenerative Medicine (in Russian). Moscow: Moscow University Press. ISBN 978-5-19-010991-7.
- Tkachuk, V. A. (2022). Regenerative Medicine (in Russian). Moscow: GEOTAR-Media.

== Interesting facts ==
- Aside from classical literature, Tkachuk is interested in historical works on science and outstanding scientists. According to him, his taste in literature was instilled by his remarkable teachers, among which was his father, Arseniy Mokeevich Tkachuk, who was considered the best Russian language teacher in Vinnytsia oblast, where Tkachuk spent his school years.
- As a matriculant of the Faculty of biology and soil science of MSU, Tkachuk lived in the fifth building of the MSU Student's House, at Lomonosovskiy prospect, house 31, building 5. It is the same building where he later worked as a department head and dean, after it was given to the Faculty of fundamental medicine. The faculty was later moved to the Lomonosov building in 2015.
