= Medical Research and Educational Institute of Moscow State University =

Russian research institute

Medical Research and Education Institute of MSU
- Медицинский научно-образовательный институт
- Established: 2025
- Parent institution: Lomonosov Moscow State University
- Location: Moscow, Russia
- Website: mnoi.msu.ru

The Medical Research and Education Institute of Moscow State University (MREI MSU; Russian: Медицинский научно-образовательный институт, МНОИ МГУ) is an academic, clinical, and research division of Lomonosov Moscow State University that integrates medical education, clinical practice, and biomedical research.

The institute was established in 2025 through the reorganization of the Medical Research and Education Center of Moscow State University (MREC MSU), which had been founded in 2005.

The institute's principal educational unit is the Faculty of Fundamental Medicine, which provides specialist degree, residency, postgraduate, and continuing medical education programmes. The institute also comprises the University Clinic of Moscow State University and the Center for Regenerative Medicine.

== History ==
Medical education at Moscow State University entered a new stage in 1992 with the establishment of the Faculty of Fundamental Medicine, the university's first medical faculty after an interruption of more than two centuries.

In 2005, Moscow State University established the Medical Research and Education Center (MREC MSU) to provide an integrated clinical, educational, and research infrastructure supporting medical education and biomedical sciences. The center incorporated the University Clinic, research laboratories, and educational facilities into a unified academic medical complex.

In 2025, following the reorganization of the university's medical complex, the Medical Research and Education Center was transformed into the Medical Research and Education Institute of Moscow State University.

== Organization ==
The Medical Research and Education Institute brings together the university's educational, clinical, and biomedical research divisions in the field of medicine.

Its principal educational unit is the Faculty of Fundamental Medicine, which offers specialist degree programmes, medical residency, postgraduate education, and continuing professional development in medicine and biomedical sciences.

The institute also includes:

- University Clinic of Moscow State University;
- Center for Regenerative Medicine of Moscow State University.

The institute's activities are based on the integration of medical education, fundamental and applied biomedical research, and specialized as well as high-technology medical care.

== Activities ==
The institute conducts educational, clinical, and research activities in the fields of fundamental, clinical, and translational medicine.

Medical education is provided primarily through the Faculty of Fundamental Medicine, which offers specialist degree programmes, medical residency, postgraduate education, and continuing professional development.

Clinical activities are carried out through the University Clinic of Moscow State University, which provides specialized and high-technology medical care across a broad range of medical specialties.

The institute's research covers fundamental and clinical medicine, molecular biology, genetics, cell technologies, regenerative medicine, medical bioengineering, bioinformatics, and other fields of biomedical science.

== Research divisions ==
The Medical Research and Education Institute comprises research divisions engaged in fundamental and applied biomedical research.

Its largest specialized research unit is the Center for Regenerative Medicine, which was established in 2016 as the Institute of Regenerative Medicine and became part of the Medical Research and Education Institute following its establishment in 2025.

The center conducts research in cell therapy, gene therapy, tissue engineering, molecular endocrinology, medical bioengineering, and tissue repair and regeneration.

== See also ==
- Lomonosov Moscow State University
- Faculty of Fundamental Medicine, Moscow State University
- Center for Regenerative Medicine, Moscow State University
