= Sergei Buturlin =

Russian ornithologist (1872–1938)

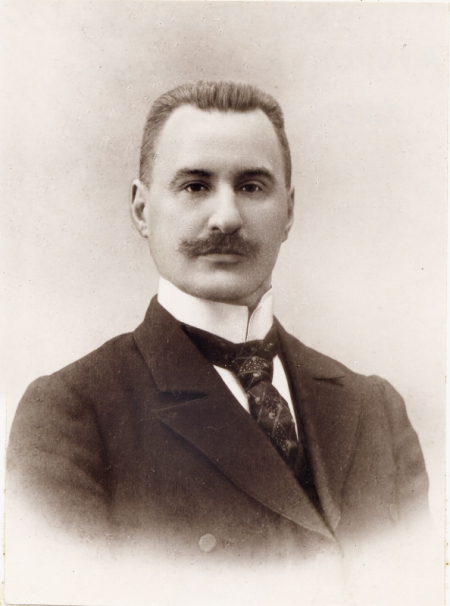

Sergei Aleksandrovich Buturlin (Russian: Серге́й Александрович Бутурлин); 22 September 1872 in Montreux – 22 January 1938 in Moscow was a Russian ornithologist. He was a pioneer in Russia of the study of the diversity of species and described more than 200 new species of bird.

== Biography ==
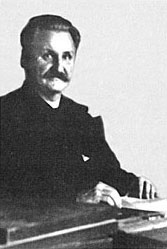
In later life

A scion of one of the oldest families of Russian nobility, Buturlin spent most his life in Russia although he was born in the Swiss town of Montreux along with a twin brother Alexander who died at the age of seven. His father A.S Buturlin (1845-1916) was physician, writer and Marxist friend of Leo Tolstoy. He went to a classical gymnasium in Simbirsk (modern Ulyanovsk) and studied jurisprudence in St. Petersburg from 1890 and graduated with a gold medal in 1894-95. He took an interest in hunting at a young age and became a friend of Boris Mikhailovich Zhitkov at an early age. Buturlin married Vera Vladimirovna Markova, the sister of a law school classmate, in 1898. The couple moved to Wesenberg (Estonia) where he served as a justice of peace until 1918. The marriage however did not last. Although his position paid a salary, his interest in zoology was greater and he spent most of his career collecting specimens across Russia and Siberia and describing the results of his observations. Until 1892 he collected in the Volga region, then in the Baltic region; from 1900 to 1902, along with B.M. Zhitkov, on the islands of Kolguyev and Novaya Zemlya. Between 1904 and 1906 he took part in an expedition to the Kolyma River in Siberia, and in 1909 he visited the Altai Mountains, and he made his final expedition in 1925 on the Chukchi Peninsula. He received a doctorate in 1936 without a dissertation. During World War I, many of Buturlin's collections were stored on the estate of his neighbour, the Krotkovs. These were raided during the 1917 revolution and thought to be lost, however some of the material was rediscovered after Buturlin's death in the Simbirsk Folk Museum. This was also a time when his mother died and a brother was shot. In 1918 he joined the zoological museum of the University of Moscow, and in 1924 he donated his collection of palaearctic birds.

In 1906 Buturlin became a foreign member of the British Ornithologists' Union; in 1907 he became a corresponding member of the American Ornithologists' Union. Buturlin published many important work on the taxonomy and distribution of the palaearctic birds, including:

- The Birds of the Kolguyev Island and Novaya Zemlya and the lower part of the Darna (1901)
- The Birds of the Simbirsk Government (1906)
- The Birds of the Yenisseisk District (1911, with Arkady Yakovlevich Tugarinov (1880–1948))
- A series of manuscripts over the birds of the Far East (1909–1917)
- Complete Synopsis of the Birds of the USSR, in three volumes
- An article on his discovery the breeding places of Ross's gull (Rhodostethia rosea) in northeast Siberia

== Works ==
- Кулики Российской Империи. Дружинина [Waders of the Russian Empire.] Druzhinin, Tula 1902.
- On the breeding-habits of the rosy gull and the pectoral sandpiper. London 1907.
- Систематические заметки о птицах Северного Кавказа. [Systematic Notes on the Birds of the North Caucasus] Machatschkala 1929.
- Определитель промысловых птиц. Советская Азия. [Field Guide to Game Birds. Soviet Asia] Moscow 1933.
- Полный определитель птиц СССР. [Complete Identification Guide to the Birds of the USSR]. KIOC, Moscow 1934–1941.
- Что и как наблюдать в жизни птиц. [What and how to observe in the life of birds] 1934.
- Трубконозые птицы. [Tubenosed Birds] КTOC, Moscow 1936.
- Дробовое ружье [The Shotgun]. 1937.
- Птицы [Birds]. Moscow 1940.

== Other sources ==
- Borodina, O. E. & T. A. Gromova: Сергей Александрович Бутурлин. Ulyanovsk 2002.
- Kozlova, Mariia Mikhailovna & Mirzoëiìan, Eduard Nikolaevich: Сергей Александрович Бутурлин 1872–1938. Наука, Moscow 2001. ISBN 5-02-005199-3
- Kozlova, Mariia Mikhailovna: Перо розовой чайки. Ulyanovsk 1997. ISBN 5-89146-016-5
