= Nikolay Zograf =

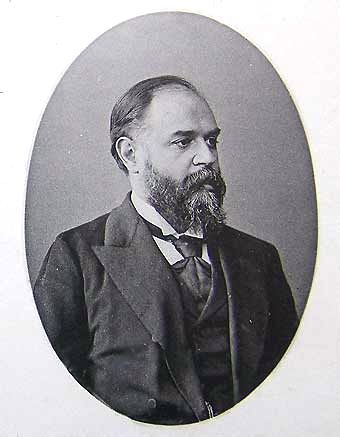
Photo from before 1917.

Nikolay Yuryevich Zograf (Russian: Николай Юрьевич Зограф; 1851–1919) was a Russian zoologist and anthropologist, Chevalier of the Order of Légion d'honneur.
