= Viktor Sadovnichiy =

Russian mathematician (born 1939)

- Виктор Садовничий
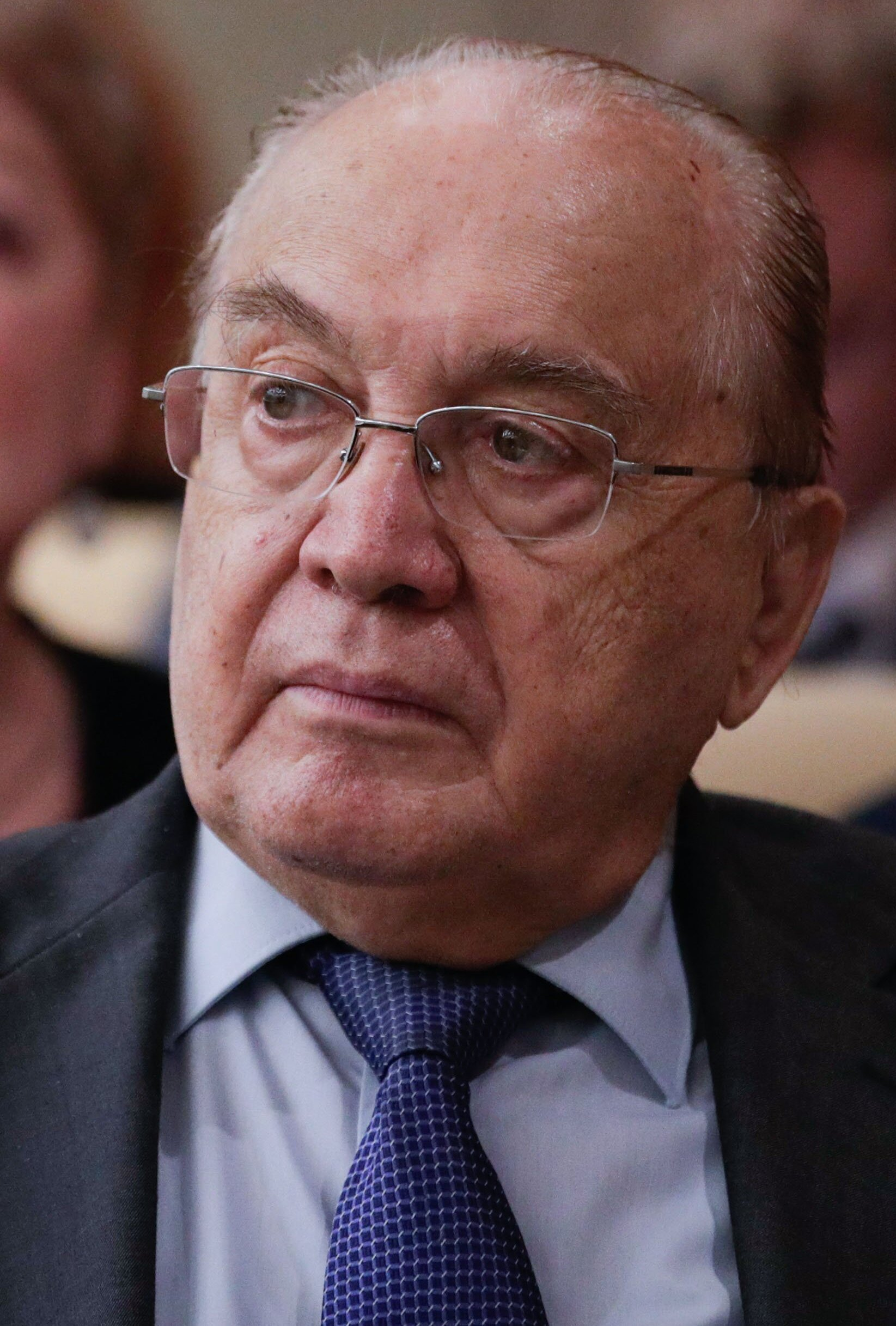
- Sadovnichiy in 2025
- Born: 3 April 1939 (age 87); Krasnopavlovka, Kharkiv Oblast, Ukrainian Soviet Socialist Republic, Soviet Union
- Citizenship: Soviet Union, then Russian Federation
- Education: Moscow State University
- Known for: Rector of Moscow State University
- Awards: Order of the Red Banner of Labour (1980, 1986); USSR State Prize (1989); Order "For Merit to the Fatherland" (1999, 2005, 2009); State Prize of the Russian Federation (2001); State Prize of the Russian Federation (2002); Order of the Rising Sun (2008); Order of Alexander Nevsky (2014)
- Scientific career
- Fields: Mathematics
- Workplaces: Rector of Moscow State University; Professor, Academic of Russian Academy of Sciences, Doctor of Sciences in Physical and Mathematical Sciences

Viktor Sadovnichiy's voice
recorded February 2006

Viktor Antonovich Sadovnichiy (Russian: Виктор Антонович Садовничий; born 3 April 1939) is a Russian mathematician, winner of the 1989 USSR State Prize, and since 1992 the rector of Moscow State University. One of the main opinion leaders in Russia, Sadovnichiy has significant political and social influence.

== Biography ==
Sadovnichiy was born in the village of Krasnopavlovka in Kharkov Oblast (now in Ukraine) to worker Anton Grigoryevich and collective farmer Anna Matveyevna.

=== Study ===
After graduating from rural school, Sadovnichiy worked for some time at the Komsomolets coal mine in Gorlovka (Donetsk Oblast) and studied at night school, from which he graduated with honors. In an interview, he said that he planned to enter the Belarusian State Agricultural Academy, but on the advice of a friend, in 1958, he entered the MSU Faculty of Mechanics and Mathematics. In 1963, he graduated with honors with a degree in mathematics.

Sadovnichiy was sent to graduate school and graduated in 1966, defending his PhD thesis on 17 March 1967 (topic: "Regularized sums of eigenvalues of general problems for ordinary differential equations"). He was a student of Anatoly Kostyuchenko. After graduate school, he remained as an assistant.

=== Early career ===
Sadovnichiy defended his doctoral thesis in 1974 (topic: "On some issues in the theory of ordinary differential equations depending on the spectral parameter"). In 1975, he became Professor. In 1981-1982, he headed the Department of Functional Analysis and Its Applications, MSU Faculty of Computational Mathematics and Cybernetics.

Since 1982, Sadovnichiy has been the head of the calculus department of the Faculty of Mechanics and Mathematics. He worked at Moscow State University in the following positions: deputy dean of the Faculty of Mechanics and Mathematics for scientific work, deputy vice-rector, vice-rector (1982-1984), and first vice-rector (1984-1992).

=== Rectorship of the MSU ===
On 23 March 1992, Sadovnichiy was elected rector of Moscow State University on an alternative basis and re-elected in 1996, 2001, and 2005 (uncontested).

Sadovnichiy has been a corresponding member of the Russian Academy of Sciences since 1994, a full member since 1997, and a member of the Academy's Presidium. In 1989, he was awarded with the USSR State Prize. From 2008 to 2013, he was Vice-President of the Russian Academy of Sciences. Doctor Emeritus of universities worldwide and the author of some 150 works.

Sadovnichiy is President of the Russian Union of Rectors (since 1994), President of the Moscow Society of Naturalists (since 2000), and Chairman of the Russian Council of School Olympiads. Member of the Board of Trustees of the Russian Academy of Education. Since 1989, he has been a member of the Council of the Association of Universities of the USSR (since 1992, the Eurasian Association of Universities); since 1992, he has been heading the Association.

Sadovnichiy is a member of the editorial board of scientific journals Problem Analysis and Public Management Design, Quantum Computers and Quantum Computing (editor-in-chief), Higher Education in Russia, and Fundamental and Applied Mathematics.

Under the scientific supervision of Sadovnichiy, more than 65 candidate's and 15 doctoral dissertations (including scientists from other countries) were prepared.

In November 2011, bas-relief portraits of outstanding university rectors were installed in the rotunda of the main building of Moscow State University: Alexander Nesmeyanov, Ivan Petrovsky, and Sadovnichiy.

In 2022, he was the lead signature on the Address of the Russian Union of Rectors, which called to support Putin in his invasion of Ukraine.

=== World financial economic crisis ===
In their co-authored article “On the Possibilities to Forecast the Current Crisis and its Second Wave” (with Askar Akaev and Andrey Korotayev) in the Russian academic journal “Ekonomicheskaya politika” (December 2010. Issue 6. Pages 39–46 Клиодинамика - математические методы в истории) the three authors published «a forecast of the second wave of the crisis, which suggested that it may start in July — August, 2011».

== Honours and awards ==
- Order "For Merit to the Fatherland";
  - 1st class (April 16, 2019) for his outstanding contribution to the development of national education and many years of research and teaching activities
  - 2nd class (25 January 2005) for outstanding contribution to the development of education and many years of scientific and teaching activities
  - 3rd class (2 April 1999) for services to science, the talent and years of diligent work
  - 4th class (31 March 2009) for the great achievements in science, education and training of qualified specialists
- Order of the Red Banner of Labour, twice
- Medal "In Commemoration of the 850th Anniversary of Moscow"
- Jubilee Medal "In Commemoration of the 100th Anniversary of the Birth of Vladimir Ilyich Lenin"
- Order of Francysk Skaryna (Belarus)
- Order of Friendship (Kazakhstan, 1998)
- Order of Merit (Ukraine);
  - 1st class (26 March 2009) for his outstanding personal contribution to strengthening Russian-Ukrainian cooperation in education and science, and many years of fruitful scientific and social activity
  - 2nd class (6 December 2002) for personal contribution into development of Ukrainian-Russian cooperation, active participation in providing for the Year of Ukraine in the Russian Federation
  - 3rd class (30 March 1999) a significant personal contribution to the development of economic and scientific-technical cooperation between Ukraine and the Russian Federation

Sadovnichiy was stripped of his Ukrainian awards on 19 January 2025 by a decree of Ukrainian President Volodymyr Zelenskyy.

- Commander of the Legion of Honour (France)
- Order of the Rising Sun, 2nd class (Japan, 2008) - for his contribution to scientific and technical cooperation and deepening understanding between the two countries
- Order of Holy Prince Daniel of Moscow, 2nd class (Russian Orthodox Church)
- USSR State Prize (1989)
- State Prize of the Russian Federation in the field of science and technology (2002)
- Award of the Government of the Russian Federation (2006, 2011, 2012)
- Honorary Citizen of Moscow (2008)
- Honorary Member of the Russian Academy of Education
- Honorary Member of Russian Academy of Arts

== Antisemitism controversy ==
In the 1970s–1980s, Sadovnichiy held positions of responsibility in the admissions committee for applicants for entrance exams at Moscow State University. Alexander Shen, George Szpiro, and other mathematicians accused Sadovnichiy of being a leading proponent of the discriminatory policy that prevented the mass admission of applicants of Jewish origin to the MSU Faculty of Mechanics and Mathematics.

== Public work ==
In 2004, Sadovnichiy was named “Person of the Year” by Rambler in the “Education and Science” nomination of the “People of the Year” project.

In October 2014, the Moscow State University, the Russian Post, and "The Teacher's Newspaper" organized a contest essays among one hundred thousand of Russian high school student on the topic "The person I trust". A few best essays, all of them written about the Russian president Vladimir Putin, were personally presented by Sadovnichiy to president Putin in October 2014.

== Political activity ==
During his studies, Sadovnichiy was engaged in social work, heading the university's student committee and the faculty's Komsomol organization.

Throughout his years at MSU, Sadovnichiy was an active member of the Communist Party of the Soviet Union, was a member of the party committees of the Faculty of Mechanics and Mathematics and Moscow State University, and in 1977 became head of the university's party committee.

Sadovnichiy said the following about the relation between his political activity and rectorship of the MSU in the early 90s:

In his (Yeltsin’s) circle, I was classified as a “red director” - after all, I was a member of the university party committee. And such a person should not become a rector. The rector was to be a reformer.

—

Since December 2002, Sadovnichiy has been a member of the political council of the Moscow regional branch of the United Russia party. He is also a member of the party's Supreme Council. He took part in the elections of deputies to the State Duma of the Russian Federation in 2003, but after that, he refused his mandate as a deputy.

On 6 February 2012, for the 2012 Russian presidential election, Sadovnichiy was officially registered as a trusted representative of Russian presidential candidate Vladimir Putin.

During the 2018 Russian presidential election, Sadovnichiy was a member of the initiative group that nominated the candidacy of Russian President Vladimir Putin. He was also included in the list of Putin's trusted representatives.

On 14 November 2019, the State Duma Committee on Education and Science approved an amendment for adoption in the second reading that will allow President Vladimir Putin to reappoint the rectors of Moscow State University and Saint Petersburg State University an unlimited number of times.

On 3 April 2022 Sadovnichiy initiated a letter of the rectors of Russian universities supporting the Russian invasion of Ukraine. The document, signed by Sadovnichiy and co-signed by 304 other rectors of Russian universities, calls, among other things, for the "demilitarization and denazification of Ukraine", for "support [to be given to] the [Russian] army and the president". The letter says that "supporting the patriotism is a duty of the [Russian] universities", and that the "[Russian] universities were always [among the] supporting piers of the [Russian] state".

In response for his support of the invasion, he was deprived of honorary doctorates from Ukrainian universities in Kyiv, Kharkiv and Dnipro. On 9 June 2022, Ukraine imposed sanctions on him.

Academic offices
| Preceded by Anatoly Logunov (1977–1992) | Rector of Moscow State University; 1992–present | Succeeded by Incumbent |
