= Krasnopavlivka =

Rural locality in Kharkiv Oblast, Ukraine

Krasnopavlivka Краснопавлівка
- Rural settlement
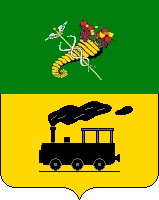
- Flag Coat of arms
- Interactive map of Krasnopavlivka
- Location within Kharkiv Oblast Location within Ukraine
- Coordinates: 49°08′25″N 36°19′25″E
- Country: Ukraine
- Oblast: Kharkiv Oblast
- Raion: Lozova Raion

Population (2022)
  - Total: 6,637
- Time zone: UTC+2 (EET)
  - Summer (DST): UTC+3 (EEST)

Krasnopavlivka (Ukrainian: Краснопавлівка) is a rural settlement in Lozova Raion of Kharkiv Oblast in Ukraine. It is located on the left bank of the Orilka, a tributary of the Oril in the drainage basin of the Dnieper. The Dnieper - Donbas canal, which follows the Orilka, is dammed as Krasnopavlivka Reservoir. Krasnopavlivka belongs to Lozova urban hromada, one of the hromadas of Ukraine. Population: 6,637 (2022 estimate).

Until 26 January 2024, Krasnopavlivka was designated urban-type settlement. On this day, a new law entered into force which abolished this status, and Krasnopavlivka became a rural settlement.

== Economy ==
=== Transportation ===
Krasnopavlivka railway station, located in the settlement, is on the railway connecting Kharkiv with Synelnykove via Lozova and Pavlohrad. There is some passenger traffic.

The settlement is connected by road with Kharkiv and with Pavlohrad where it has further access via highways with Dnipro and Zaporizhzhia.
