= Ivan Dvigubsky =

Ivan Alekseevich Dvigubski
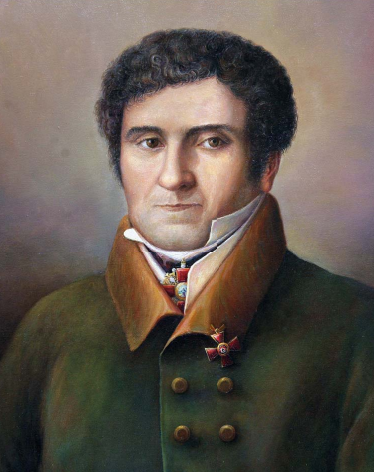
- Born: February 24, 1771; Korocha
- Died: December 30, 1839 (aged 68); Kashira
- Education: Doctor of Science (1802)
- Alma mater: Imperial Moscow University (1796)
- Scientific career
- Fields: Natural History
- Workplaces: Imperial Moscow University
- Thesis: Primitiae Faunae Mosquensis

Ivan Alekseevich Dvigubsky (Russian: Ива́н Алексе́евич Двигу́бский; 1771–1839) was a Russian naturalist, professor and rector of the Imperial University of Moscow.

== Biography ==
He was a student of the medical faculty of the Imperial Moscow University from 1793 to 1796). He was elected professor of the Imperial University of Moscow in 1804. He served as rector of the Imperial Moscow University from 1826 to 1833.

Dvigubski lectured in Russian and called on Russian scientists to write scientific works in Russian: "As long as the Russian language is not respected by Russians themselves, it will be difficult to produce anything better. When people write for Russians, but do not teach the sciences in Russian, where can one gain a knowledge of one's native language and attachment to it? In all Europe, perhaps, only Russia is not proud of her language..."

Dvigubsky published in 1828 the first study on the flora of the Moscow region, Flora of Moscow, or a Description of Wild Plants Growing in the Moscow Province, which included 924 species, as well as a short guide to wild plants in the vicinity of Moscow (An Easy Way to Recognize Wild Plants in the Fields of Moscow, first edition 1827, second edition 1838). He also wrote one of the first Russian physics textbooks (first edition 1808, third edition in two parts 1824-1825).

The standard author abbreviation Dwig. is used to indicate this person as the author when citing a botanical name.
