= Khariton Chebotaryov =

Khariton Andreyevich Chebotaryov (Russian: Харитон Андреевич Чеботарёв) (1746, Vologda – July 26, 1815, Moscow) was a rector of the Moscow University (1803-1805), state counsellor, and ordinary professor of history, morality, and eloquence.

Khariton Chebotaryov was born in Vologda into a poor family. In 1755, he entered a gymnasium under the Moscow University, becoming a university student six years later. Upon his graduation from the university in 1764, Chebotaryov was soon hired by his alma mater as a translator from Latin and German. In 1767, he was transferred to the gymnasium as a teacher of history and geography. In 1773, Khariton Chebotaryov was entrusted with teaching Russian literature, simultaneously doing translations from Latin, German, and French with his students. In 1775, he was appointed deputy librarian (суб-библиотекарь) of the university library (only a professor could hold this post) and editor-in-chief of the Moskovskie Vedomosti for the next three years. In 1776, Khariton Chebotaryov became an extraordinary professor at the Russian Literature Department, simultaneously remaining a philosophy and world history teacher at the gymnasium. Upon the death of Professor Johann Gottfried Reichel, Chebotaryov delivered lectures on European history and Russian literature at the gymnasium. In 1778, Khariton Chebotaryov was made an ordinary professor and appointed librarian and censor at the university theater. In 1778-1783, he was a secretary of the academic council (университетская конференция), inspector of the university gymnasium and normal school. In 1782, Khariton Chebotaryov was promoted to the rank of a collegiate assessor and then court councilor (1786). At the behest of the Empress, he and Anton Barsov were engaged in copying out notes from Russian chronicles, located at synodal and patriarchal libraries and Moscow State Archive. These notes were later presented to Catherine the Great and then served as a source for her Notes on Russian History. In consideration of his efforts, Khariton Chebotaryov was rewarded with 500 silver rubles. After the transformation of the university charter, Chebotaryov was elected its rector (being in the rank of collegiate councilor) and awarded with the Order of Saint Anna (2nd Class). Upon his resignation from this post, Chebotaryov was appointed a permanent representative of the university board, remaining as such until his death. In 1809, Khariton Chebotaryov was promoted to the rank of state councilor. During the Patriotic War of 1812, he lost his precious library and personal archives, which would come to him as a shock and greatly undermine his health. As a result, Chebotaryov suffered a stroke and died on July 26, 1815. He was interred at the Vagankovo Cemetery in Moscow.

Khariton Chebotaryov is known to have been a member of several learned societies, such as the Free Russian Assembly (Вольное Российское Собрание), Society of the Admirers of the Russian Language (Общество Любителей Русской Словесности; honorary member), Society of History and Russian Antiquities (Общество Истории и Древностей Российских; chairman), and Moscow Masonic Lodge.
