= Aleksandr Tikhomirov =

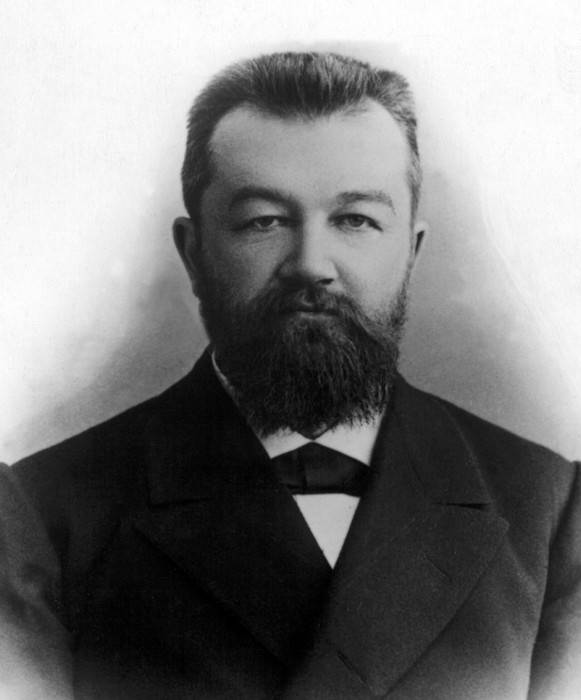

Aleksandr Andreyevich Tikhomirov (Russian: Александр Андреевич Тихомиров, 1 October [O.S. 19 September] 1850 – October 23, 1931) was a Russian zoologist. After graduating from the Saint Petersburg University and the Moscow University, Tikhomirov became a Professor of the latter and the director of the zoological museum attached to it.

His major works, containing anti-darwinism, concern the anatomy, embryology, and physiology of the silkworm. In 1886 Tikhomirov discovered the artificial parthenogenesis on the silkworm's grain.
