= Pavel Nekrasov =

Russian mathematician (1853–1924)

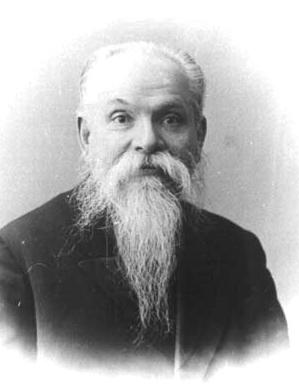

Pavel Alekseevich Nekrasov (1853–1924) was a Russian mathematician and a Rector of the Imperial University of Moscow.

== Biography ==
Nekrasov studied at the Orthodox theological seminary and from 1874 at the University of Moscow. There he was a pupil of the mathematician Nikolai Vasilievich Bugaev. Several years after his graduation, he became a Privatdozent there in 1885 (having received his Russian PhD in the same year, corresponding to a habilitation in the West) and, in 1885 or 1886, an associate professor at Moscow University (where he had been since 1883). In 1890 he received a full professorship. In 1893 he became rector. After his term as rector, he actually wanted to retire, but was not allowed to. He also taught 1885–1891 probability theory and higher mathematics at the Moscow Institute of Land Surveying. From 1898 he was almost only with administrative duties for the Ministry of Education (he was curator of the university and responsible for the schools in Moscow and the surrounding area) and moved in 1905 to Saint Petersburg as a member of the Council of the Ministry of Education. After the Russian Revolution, he tried to adapt to the new rulers, dealt with mathematical economics (which he held lectures in 1918–19) and studied Marxism.

However, his rapprochement with Marxism earned him no recognition. On the contrary, with some of his writings, after his death he was a major target of attacks against religiously influenced mathematicians, culminating in the arrest of Dmitri Egorov and the Luzin affair. In 1891 he was vice-president of the Moscow Mathematical Society and was its president from 1903 to 1905. From 1891 to 1894 he was vice-president of the Society of Friends of Science in Moscow.

He dealt with algebra, analysis, mechanics and probability theory. In the latter area he made substantial contributions, which were criticized in his time by Andrey Markov and Aleksandr Lyapunov, because he could not present them in a satisfactory form, and even later he was forgotten. Markov and Lyapunov are today usually called as representatives of the St. Petersburg School (founded by Pafnuty Chebyshev) when it comes to the question of the first mathematically strict treatment of the central limit theorem, the discussion and debate with Nekrasov played a significant role (especially one essay from 1898).

Nekrasov died of pneumonia in 1924.

== Books ==
- The Theory of Probability: Central Limit Theorem
- Method of Least Squares
- Reactionary Views
- Teaching of Probability Theory
- Further Developments
