= History of computing in the Soviet Union =

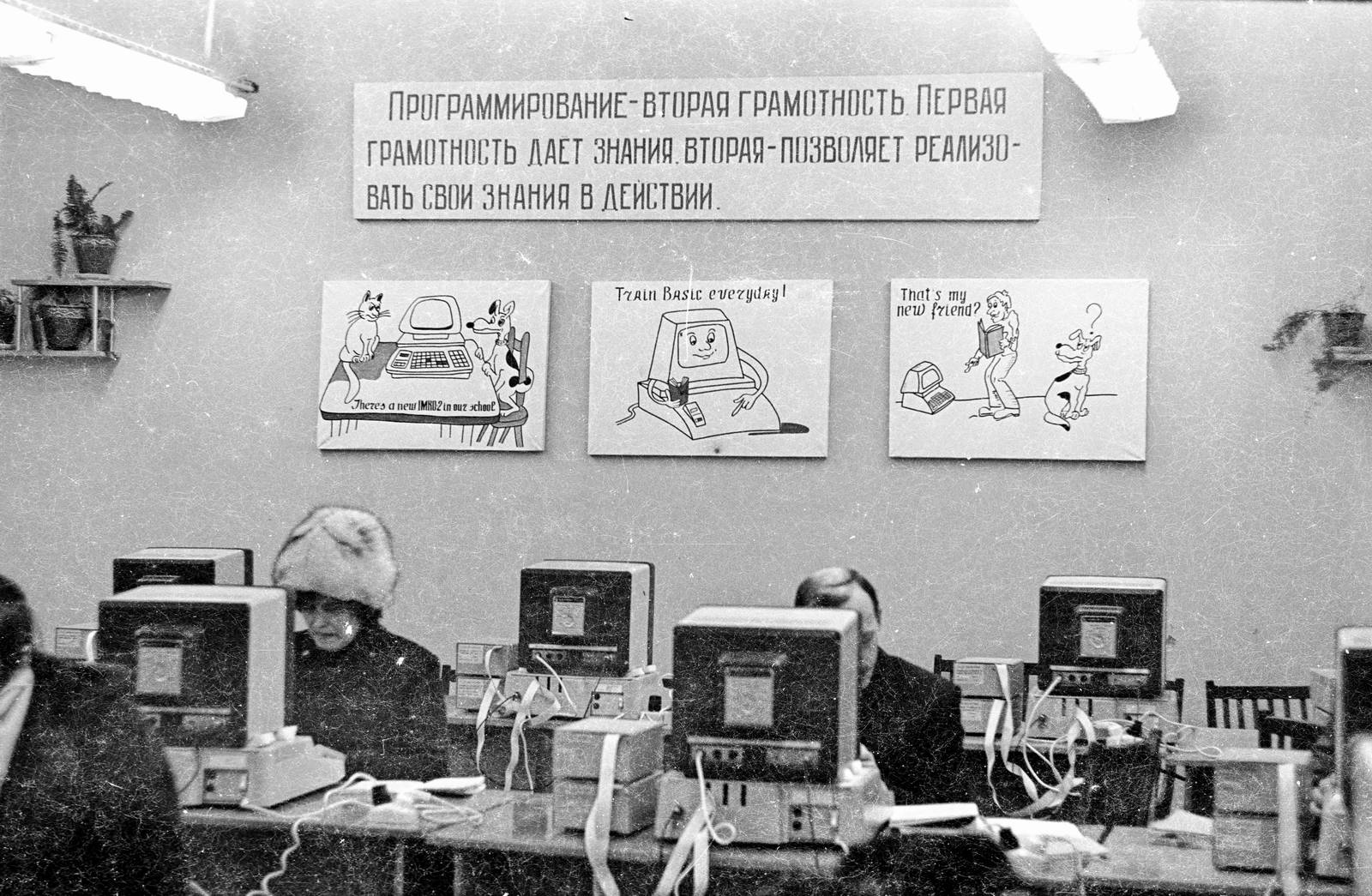
Computer class at Chkalovski Village School No. 2 in 1985–1986

The history of computing in the Soviet Union began in the late 1940s, when the country began to develop its Small Electronic Calculating Machine (MESM) at the Kiev Institute of Electrotechnology in Feofaniya. Initial ideological opposition to cybernetics in the Soviet Union was overcome by a Khrushchev era policy that encouraged computer production.

By the early 1970s, the uncoordinated work of competing government ministries had left the Soviet computer industry in disarray. Due to lack of common standards for peripherals and lack of digital storage capacity the Soviet Union's technology significantly lagged behind the West's semiconductor industry. The Soviet government decided to abandon development of original computer designs and encouraged cloning of existing Western systems (e.g. the 1801 CPU series was scrapped in favor of the PDP-11 ISA by the early 1980s).

Soviet industry was unable to mass-produce computers to acceptable quality standards and locally manufactured copies of Western hardware were unreliable. As personal computers spread to industries and offices in the West, the Soviet Union's technological lag increased.

Nearly all Soviet computer manufacturers ceased operations after the breakup of the Soviet Union. A few companies that survived into the 1990s used foreign components and never achieved large production volumes.

== History ==
=== Early history ===
In 1936, an analog computer known as a water integrator was designed by Vladimir Lukyanov. It was the world's first computer for solving partial differential equations.

The Soviet Union began to develop digital computers after World War II. A universally programmable electronic computer was created by a team of scientists directed by Sergey Lebedev at the Kiev Institute of Electrotechnology in Feofaniya. The computer, known as MESM (Russian: МЭСМ; Малая Электронно-Счетная Машина, Small Electronic Calculating Machine), became operational in 1950. By some authors it was also depicted as the first such computer in continental Europe, even though the Zuse Z4 and the Swedish BARK preceded it. The MESM's vacuum tubes were obtained from radio manufacturers.

Government rhetoric portrayed cybernetics in the Soviet Union as a capitalist attempt to further undermine workers' rights. The Soviet weekly newspaper Literaturnaya Gazeta published a 1950 article strongly critical of Norbert Wiener and his book, Cybernetics: Or Control and Communication in the Animal and the Machine, describing Wiener as one of the "charlatans and obscurantists whom capitalists substitute for genuine scientists". After the publication of the article, his book was removed from Soviet research libraries.

The first large-scale computer, the BESM-1, was assembled in Moscow at the Lebedev Institute of Precision Mechanics and Computer Engineering. Soviet work on computers was first made public at the Darmstadt Conference in 1955.

=== Post-Stalin era ===
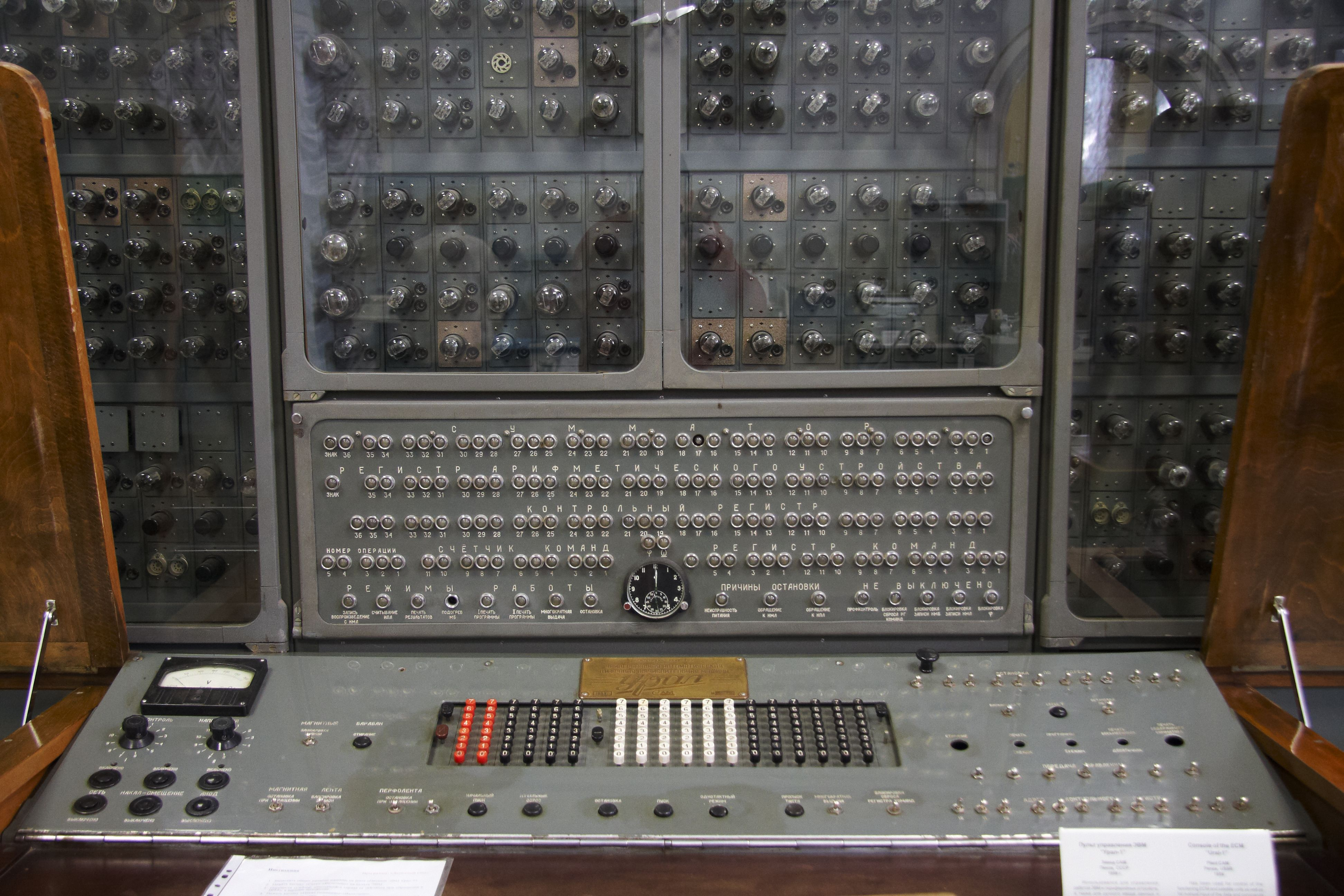
Ural-1 control unit

As in the United States, early computers were intended for scientific and military calculations. Automatic data processing systems made their debut by the mid-1950s with the Minsk and Ural systems, both designed by the Ministry of Radio Technology. The Ministry of Instrument Making also entered the computer field with the ASVT system, which was based on the PDP-8.

The Strela computer, commissioned in December 1956, performed calculations for Yuri Gagarin's first crewed spaceflight. The Strela was designed by Special Design Bureau 245 (SKB-245) of the Ministry of Instrument Making. Strela chief designer Yury Bazilevslky received the Hero of Socialist Labor title for his work on the project. Setun, an experimental ternary computer, was designed and manufactured in 1959.

The Khrushchev Thaw relaxed ideological limitations, and by 1961 the government encouraged the construction of computer factories. The Mir-1, Mir-2 and Mir-3 computers were produced at the Institute of Cybernetics of the Academy of Sciences of Ukrainian SSR during the 1960s. Victor Glushkov began his work on OGAS, a real-time, decentralised, hierarchical computer network, in the early 1960s, but the project was never completed. Soviet factories began manufacturing transistor computers during the early years of the decade.

At that time, ALGOL was the most common programming language in Soviet computing centers. ALGOL 60 was used with a number of domestic variants, including ALGAMS, MALGOL and Alpha. ALGOL remained the most popular language for university instruction into the 1970s.

The MINSK-2 was a solid-state digital computer that went into production in 1962, and the Central Intelligence Agency attempted to obtain a model. The BESM-6, introduced in 1965, performed at about 800 KIPS on the Gibson Mix benchmark—ten times greater than any other serially-produced Soviet computer of the period, and similar in performance to the CDC 3600. From 1968 to 1987, 355 BESM-6 units were produced. With instruction pipelining, memory interleaving and virtual address translation, the BESM-6 was advanced for the era; however, it was less well known at the time than the MESM.

The Ministry of the Electronics Industry was established in 1965, ending the Ministry of Radio Technology's primacy in computer production. The following year, the Soviet Union signed a cooperation agreement with France to share research in the computing field after the United States prevented France from purchasing a CDC 6600 mainframe. In 1967, the Unified System of Electronic Computers project was launched to create a general-purpose computer with the other Comecon countries.

Soyuz 7K-L1 was the first Soviet-piloted spacecraft with an onboard digital computer, the Argon-11S. Construction of the Argon-11S was completed in 1968 by the Scientific Research Institute of Electronic Machines. According to Piers Bizony, lack of computing power was a factor in the failure of the Soviet crewed lunar programs.

=== Semiconductor industry ===
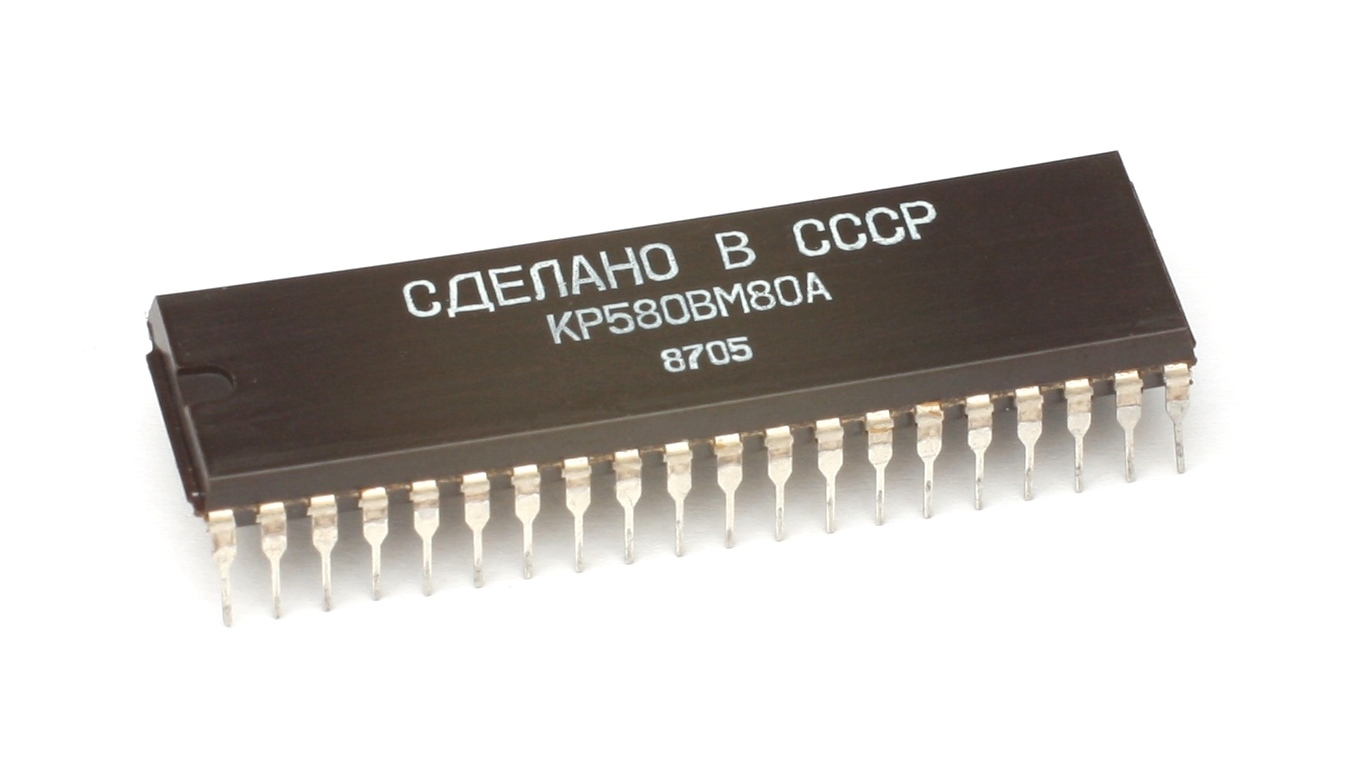
The KR580VM80A, a clone of the Intel 8080 CPU

The Soviets realized the strategic implications of semiconductors already in the late 1950s, and new facilities were set up to manufacture them in cities like Leningrad and Riga. Soviet scientists took advantage of student exchange agreements with the US to study the technology, attending lectures by pioneers of the field such as William Shockley. The first Soviet integrated circuit was produced in 1962, under the direction of Yuri Osokin.

Joel Barr, an American-born Soviet spy who had previously infiltrated US-based technology companies, successfully lobbied Khrushchev to build a new city devoted to the production of semiconductors. The new city was given the name of Zelenograd.

As a local semiconductor industry began to develop in the 1960s, Soviet scientists were increasingly ordered to copy Western designs (such as the Texas Instruments SN-51) without any changes. In hindsight, the approach was poorly suited to the fast-evolving world of chip manufacturing, which continued to change according to Moore's Law.

=== 1970s ===
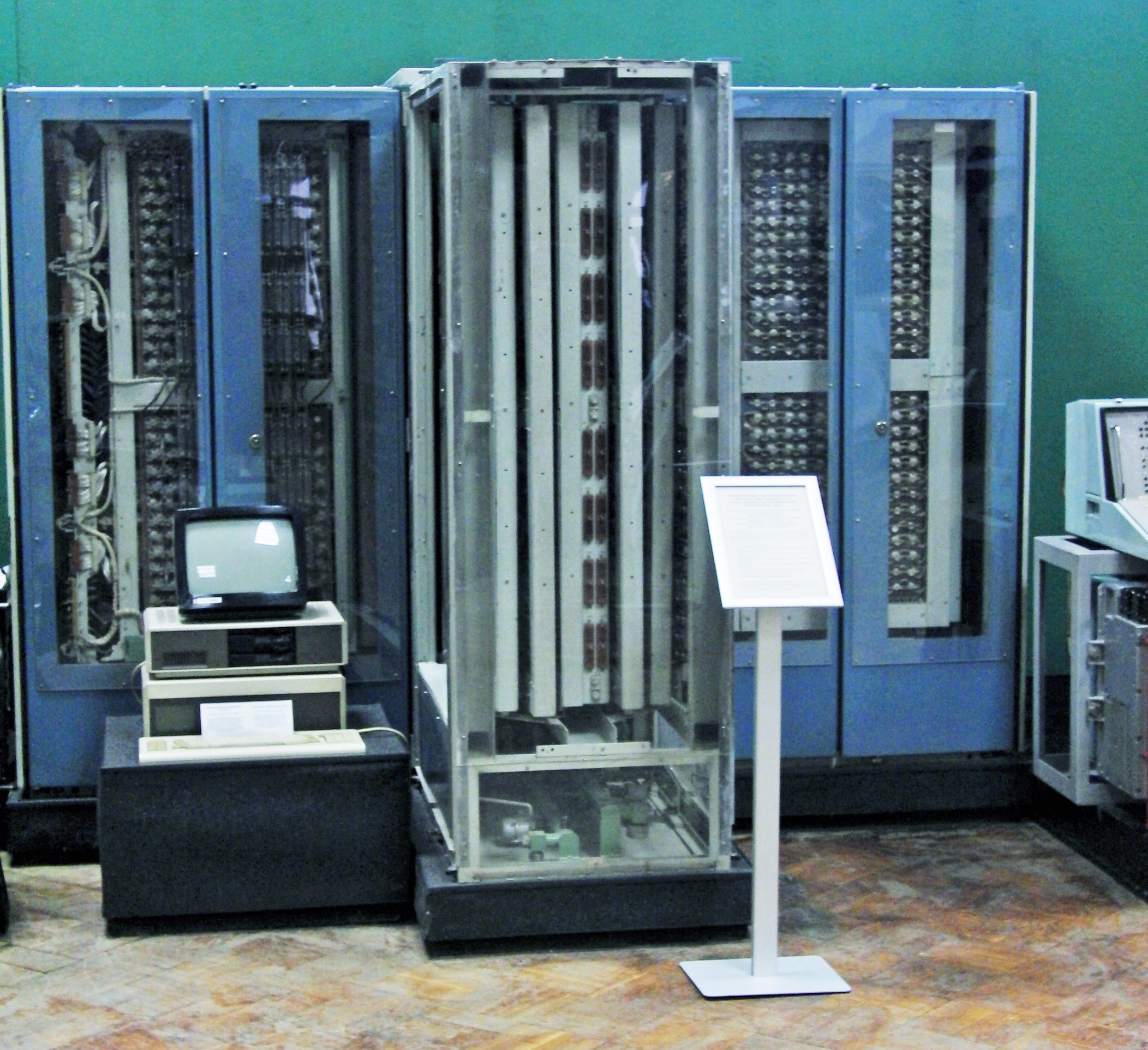
Elbrus computer in Moscow's Polytechnic Museum

By the early 1970s, the lack of common standards in peripherals and digital capacity led to a significant technological lag behind Western producers. Hardware limitations forced Soviet programmers to write programs in machine code until the early 1970s. Users were expected to maintain and repair their own hardware; local modifications made it difficult (or impossible) to share software, even between similar machines.

According to the Ninth five-year plan (1971–1975), Soviet computer production would increase by 2.6 times to a total installed base of 25,000 by 1975, implying about 7,000 computers in use as of 1971. The plan discussed producing in larger quantities the integrated circuit-based Ryad, but BESM remained the most common model, with ASVT still rare. Rejecting Stalin's opinion, the plan foresaw using computers for national purposes such as widespread industrial automation, econometrics, and a statewide central planning network. Some experts such as Barry Boehm of RAND and Victor Zorza thought that Soviet technology could catch up to the West with intensive effort like the Soviet space program, but others such as Marshall Goldman believed that such was unlikely without capitalist competition and user feedback, and failures of achieving previous plans' goals.

The government decided to end original development in the industry, encouraging the pirating of Western systems. An alternative option, a partnership with the Britain-based International Computers Limited, was considered but ultimately rejected. The ES EVM mainframe, launched in 1971, was based on the IBM/360 system. The copying was possible because although the IBM/360 system implementation was protected by a number of patents, IBM published a description of the system's architecture (enabling the creation of competing implementations).

The Soviet Academy of Sciences, which had been a major player in Soviet computer development, could not compete with the political influence of the powerful ministries and was relegated to a monitoring role. Hardware research and development became the responsibility of research institutes attached to the ministries. By the early 1970s, with chip technology becoming increasingly relevant to defense applications, Zelenograd emerged as the center of the Soviet microprocessing industry; foreign technology designs were imported, legally or otherwise.

The Ninth five-year plan approved a scaled-back version of the earlier OGAS project, and the EGSVT network, which was to link the higher echelons of planning departments and administrations. The poor quality of Soviet telephone systems impeded remote data transmission and access. The telephone system was barely adequate for voice communication, and a Western researcher deemed it unlikely that it could be significantly improved before the end of the 20th century.

In 1973, Lebedev stepped down from his role as director of the Institute of Precision Mechanics and Computer Engineering. He was replaced by Vsevolod Burtsev, who promoted development of the Elbrus computer series.

In the spirit of detente, in 1974 the Nixon administration decided to relax export restrictions on computer hardware and raised the allowed computing power to 32 million bits per second. In 1975, the Soviet Union placed an order with IBM to supply process-control and management computers for its new Kamaz truck plant. IBM systems were also purchased for Intourist to establish a computer reservation system before the 1980 Summer Olympics.

=== Early 1980s ===
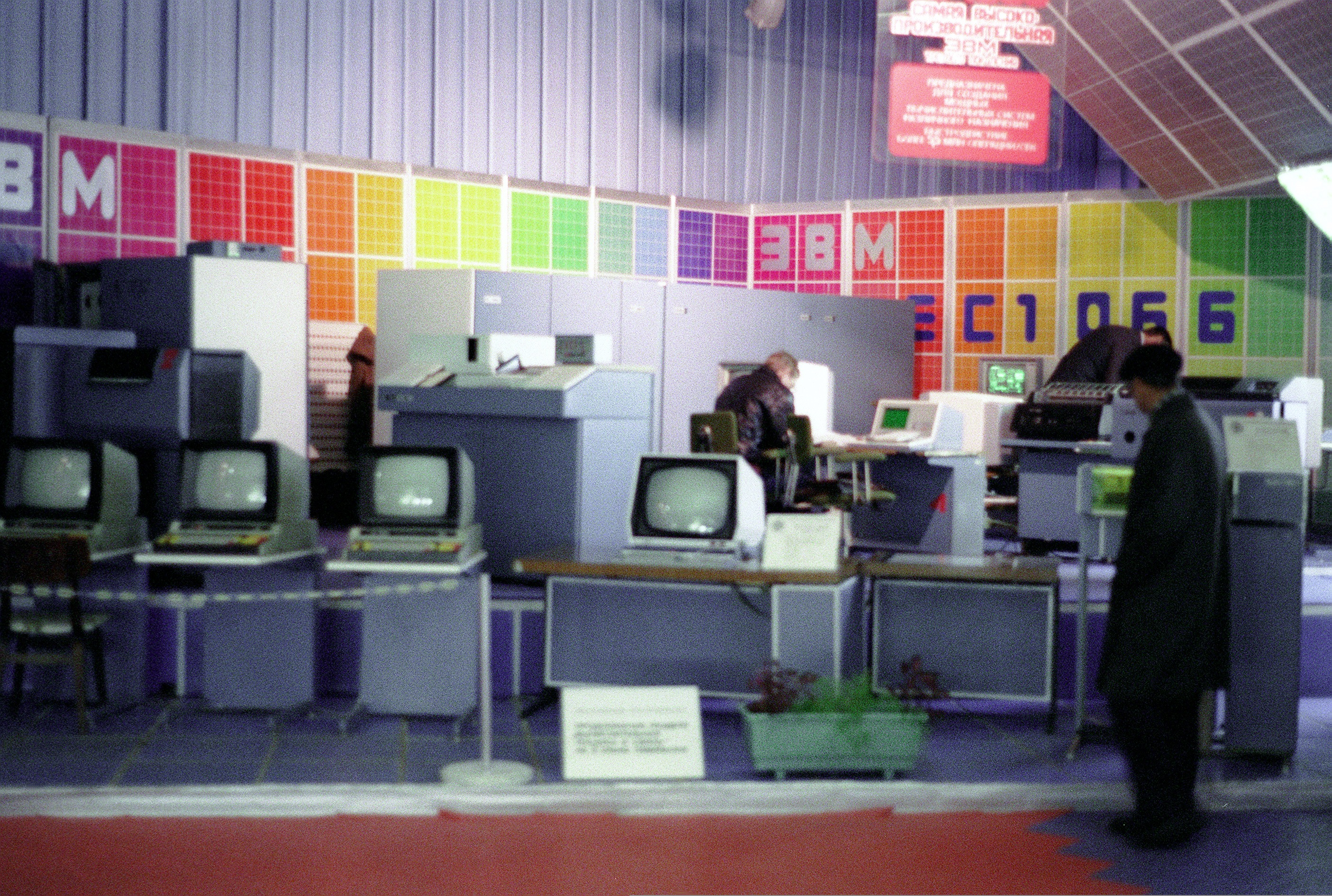
Soviet computers in 1985

The Soviet computer industry continued to stagnate through the 1980s. As personal computers spread to offices and industries in the United States and most Western countries, the Soviet Union failed to keep up. By 1989, there were over 200,000 computers in the country. In 1984 the Soviet Union had about 300,000 trained programmers, but they did not have enough equipment to be productive.

Although the Ministry of Radio Technology was the leading manufacturer of Soviet computers by 1980, the ministry's leadership viewed the development of a prototypical personal computer with deep skepticism and thought that a computer could never be personal. The following year, when the Soviet government adopted a resolution to develop microprocessor technology, the ministry's attitude changed.

The spread of computer systems in Soviet companies was similarly slow, with one-third of Soviet plants with over 500 workers having access to a mainframe computer in 1984 (compared to nearly 100 percent in the United States). The success of Soviet managers was measured by the degree to which they met plan goals, and computers made it more difficult to alter accounting calculations to artificially reach targets; companies with computer systems seemed to perform worse than companies without them.

The computer hobby movement emerged in the Soviet Union during the early 1980s, drawing from a long history of radio and electric hobbies. In 1978, three employees of the Moscow Institute of Electronic Machine Building built a computer prototype based on the new KR580IK80 microprocessor and named it Micro-80. After failing to elicit any interest from the ministries, they published schematics in Radio magazine and made it into the first Soviet DIY computer. The initiative was successful (although the necessary chips could then only be purchased on the black market), leading to the Radio-86RK and several other computer projects.

Piracy was especially common in the software industry, where copies of Western applications were widespread. American intelligence agencies, having learned about Soviet piracy efforts, placed bugs in copied software which caused later, catastrophic failures in industrial systems. One such bug caused an explosion in a Siberian gas pipeline in 1982, after pump and valve settings were altered to produce pressures far beyond the tolerance of pipeline joints and welds. The explosion caused no casualties, but led to significant economic damage.

In July 1984, the COCOM sanctions prohibiting the export of a number of common desktop computers to the Soviet Union were lifted; at the same time, the sale of large computers was further restricted. In 1985, the Soviet Union purchased over 10,000 MSX computers from Nippon Gakki.

The state of scientific computing was particularly backwards, with the CIA commenting that "to the Soviets, the acquisition of a single Western supercomputer would give a 10%–100% increase in total scientific computing power."

=== Perestroika ===
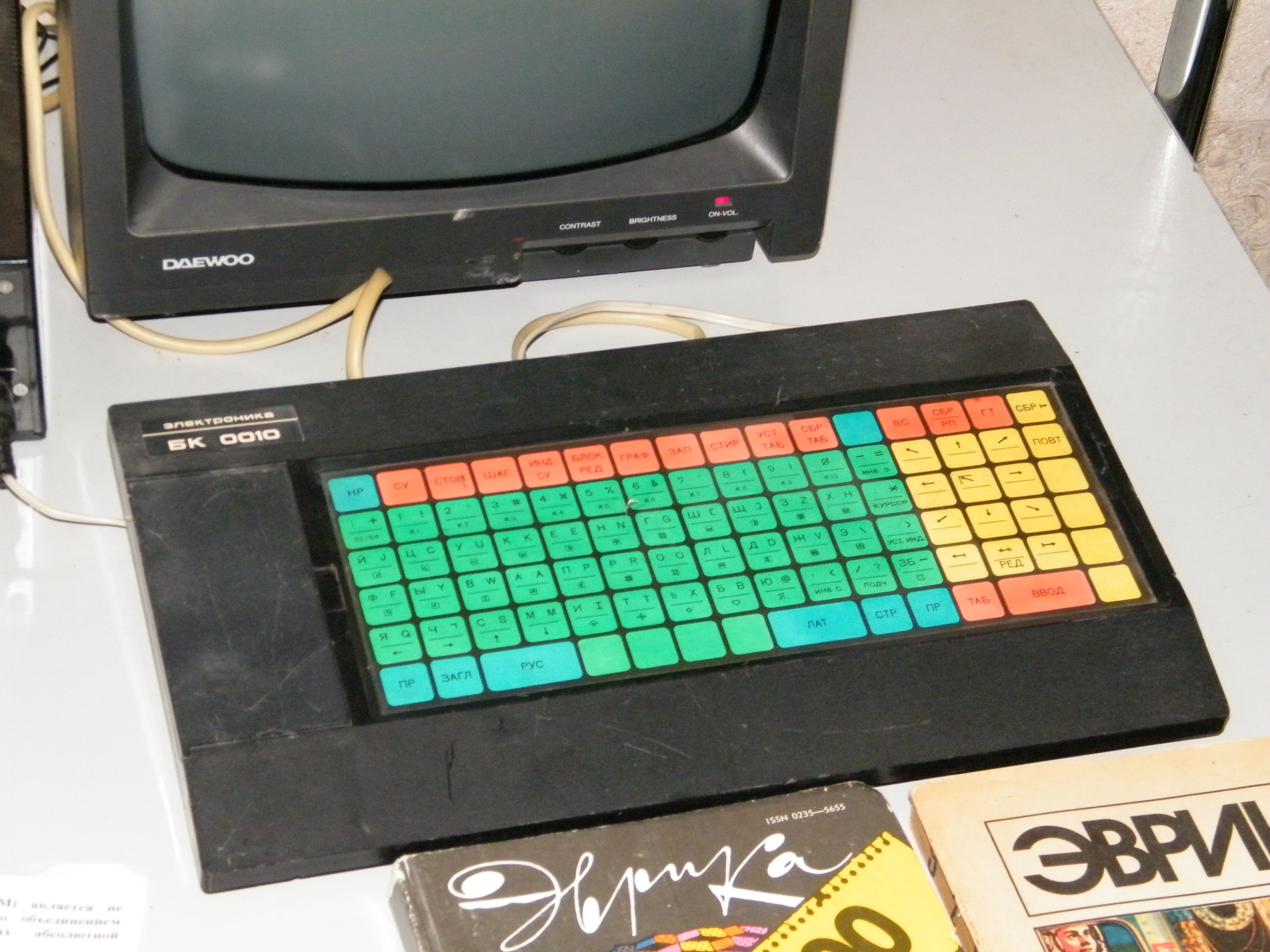
The BK-0010, the most widely produced Soviet home computer

A program to expand computer literacy in Soviet schools was one of the first initiatives announced by Mikhail Gorbachev after he came to power in 1985. That year, the Elektronika BK-0010 was the first Soviet personal computer in common use in schools and as a consumer product. It was the only Soviet personal computer to be manufactured in more than a few thousand units.

The 12th five-year plan demanded the production of over one million personal computers, and 10 million floppy disks. Between 1986 and 1988, Soviet schools received 87,808 computers out of a planned 111,000. About 60,000 were BK-0010s, as part of the KUVT-86 computer-facility systems.

Although Soviet hardware copies lagged somewhat behind their Western counterparts in performance, their main issue was generally-poor reliability. The Agat, an Apple II clone, was particularly prone to failure; disks read by one system could be unreadable by others. An August 1985 issue of Pravda reported, "There are complaints about computer quality and reliability". The Agat was ultimately discontinued due to problems with supplying components, such as disk drives.

The Vector-06C, released in 1986, was noted for its relatively advanced graphics capability. The Vector could display up to 256 colors when the BK-0010 had only four hard-coded colors, without palettes.

In 1987, it was learned that Kongsberg Gruppen and Toshiba had sold CNC milling machines to the Soviet Union in what became known as the Toshiba-Kongsberg scandal. The president of Toshiba resigned, and the company was threatened with a five-year ban from the US market.

The passage of the Law on Cooperatives in May 1988 led to a rapid proliferation of companies trading computers and hardware components. Many software cooperatives were established, employing as much as one-fifth of all Soviet programmers by 1988. The Tekhnika cooperative, created by Artyom Tarasov, managed to sell its own software to state agencies including Gossnab.

IBM-compatible Soviet-made computers were introduced 1985 (Neiron i9.66), but their cost put them beyond the reach of Soviet households. The Poisk, released in 1989, was the most common IBM-compatible Soviet computer. Because of production difficulties, no personal computer model was ever mass-produced.

As Western technology embargoes were relaxed during the late perestroika era, the Soviets increasingly adopted foreign systems. In 1989, the Moscow Institute of Thermal Technology acquired 70 to 100 IBM XT-AT systems with 8086 microprocessors. The poor quality of domestic manufacturing led the country to import over 50,000 personal computers from Taiwan in 1989.

Increasingly-large import deals were signed with Western manufacturers but, as the Soviet economy unraveled, companies struggled to obtain hard currency to pay for them and deals were postponed or canceled. Control Data Corporation reportedly agreed to barter computers for Soviet Christmas cards.

Human-rights groups in the West pressured the Soviet government to grant exit visas to all computer experts who wanted to emigrate. Soviet authorities eventually complied, leading to a massive loss of talent in the computing field.

=== 1990s and legacy ===
In August 1990, RELCOM (a UUCP computer network working on telephone lines) was established. The network connected to EUnet through Helsinki, enabling access to Usenet. By the end of 1991, it had about 20,000 users. In September 1990, the .su domain was created.

By early 1991, the Soviet Union was on the verge of collapse; procurement orders were cancelled en masse, and half-finished products from computer plants were discarded as the breakdown of the centralized supply system made it impossible to complete them. The large Minsk Computer Plant attempted to survive the new conditions by switching to the production of chandeliers. Western export restrictions on civilian computer equipment were lifted in May 1991. Although this technically allowed the Soviets to export computers to the West, their technological lag gave them no market there. News of the August 1991 Soviet coup attempt was spread to Usenet groups through Relcom.

With the fall of the Soviet Union, many prominent Soviet computer developers and engineers (including future Intel processor architect Vladimir Pentkovski) moved abroad. The large companies and plants which had manufactured computers for the Soviet military ceased to exist. Computers made in post-Soviet countries during the early 1990s were assembled almost exclusively with foreign components.

Soviet computers remained in common use in Russia until the mid-1990s. Post-Soviet Russian personal computer market was initially dominated by foreign brands like Acer and IBM, which exported computers into Russia from manufacturing facilities abroad. Starting in the mid-1990s, indigenous Russian computer firms began rapidly gaining market share from imports. By 1996, locally assembled PCs accounted for around two-thirds of unit sales in Russia.

The Elbrus VLIW architecture, introduced in the Elbrus 2000 microprocessor launched in 2001, traces its roots to the early Soviet VLIW research.

== Western sanctions ==
Since computers were considered strategic goods by the United States, their sale by Western countries was generally not allowed without special permission. As a result of the CoCom embargo, companies from Western Bloc countries could not export computers to the Soviet Union (or service them) without a special license.

Even when sales were not forbidden by CoCom policies, the US government might still ask Western European countries to refrain from exporting computers because of foreign-policy matters, such as protesting the arrest of Soviet dissidents. Software sales were not regulated as strictly, since Western policymakers realized that software could be copied (or smuggled) much more easily.

== Appraisal ==
Soviet computer software and hardware designs were often on par with Western ones, but the country's persistent inability to improve manufacturing quality meant that it could not make practical use of theoretical advances. Quality control, in particular, was a major weakness of the Soviet computing industry.

The decision to abandon original development in the early 1970s, rather than closing the gap with Western technology, is seen as another factor causing the Soviet computer industry to fall further behind. According to Vlad Strukov, this decision destroyed the country's indigenous computer industry. The software industry followed a similar path, with Soviet programmers moving their focus to duplicating Western operating systems (including DOS/360 and CP/M). According to Boris Babayan, the decision was costly in terms of time and resources; Soviet scientists had to study obsolete Western software and then rewrite it, often in its entirety, to make it work with Soviet equipment.

Valery Shilov considered this view subjective and nostalgic. Dismissing the notion of a "golden age" of Soviet computing hardware, he argued that except for a few world-class achievements, Soviet computers had always been far behind their Western equivalents (even before large-scale cloning). Computer manufacturers in countries such as Japan also based their early computers on Western designs, but had unrestricted access to foreign technology and manufacturing equipment. They focused their production on the consumer market rather than military applications, allowing them to achieve better economies of scale. Unlike Soviet manufacturers, they gained experience in marketing their products to consumers.

Piracy of Western software such as WordStar, SuperCalc and dBase was endemic in the Soviet Union, a situation attributed to the inability of the domestic software industry to meet the demand for high-quality applications. Software was not shared as commonly or easily as in the West, leaving Soviet scientific users highly dependent on the applications available at their institutions. The State Committee for Computing and Informatics estimated that out of 700,000 computer programs developed by 1986, only 8,000 had been officially registered, and only 500 were deemed good enough to be distributed as production systems. According to Hudson Institute researchers Richard W. Judy and Robert W. Clough, the situation in the Soviet software industry was such that "it does not deserve to be called an industry".

The Soviet Union, unlike contemporary industrializing countries such as Taiwan and South Korea, did not establish a sustainable computer industry. Robert W. Strayer attributed this failure to the shortcomings of the Soviet command economy, where monopolistic ministries closely controlled the activities of factories and companies. Three government ministries (the Ministry of Instrument Making, the Ministry of the Radio Industry and the Ministry of the Electronics Industry) were responsible for developing and manufacturing computer hardware. They had scant resources and overlapping responsibilities. Instead of pooling resources and sharing development, they were locked in conflicts and rivalries and jockeyed for money and influence.

Soviet academia still made notable contributions to computer science, such as Leonid Khachiyan's paper, "Polynomial Algorithms in Linear Programming". The Elbrus-1, developed in 1978, implemented a two-issue out-of-order processor with register renaming and speculative execution; according to Keith Diefendorff, this was almost 15 years ahead of Western superscalar processors.

== Timeline ==
- November 1950 – MESM, the first universally programmable electronic computer in the Soviet Union, becomes operational.
- 1951 – Automatic Digital Computer M-1 was completed.
- 1959 – Setun, an experimental ternary computer, is designed and manufactured.
- 1965 – the Ministry of the Electronics Industry is established, ending the Ministry of Radio Technology's primacy in computer production.
- 1971 – the ES EVM mainframe, based on the IBM/360 system, is launched.
- 1974 – NPO Tsentrprogrammsistem (Центрпрограммсистем) is established under the Ministry of Instrument Making to act as a centralized fund and distributor of software.
- November 1975 – the State Committee on Inventions and Discovery rules that computer programs are ineligible for protection under the Soviet Law of Inventions.
- 1982 – the Belle chess machine is impounded by the United States Customs Service before it can reach a Moscow chess exhibition because they thought it might be useful to the Soviet military.
- 1984 – the popular video game Tetris is invented by Alexey Pajitnov.
- August 1988 – The Soviet Union's first computer virus, known as DOS-62, is detected in the Institute of Program Systems of the Soviet Academy of Sciences.
- August 1990 – RELCOM (a UUCP computer network working on telephone lines) is established.
- December 1991 – the Soviet Union is dissolved.

== See also ==
- Bibliography of science and technology in Russia and the Soviet Union
- History of computer hardware in Eastern Bloc countries
- List of Soviet computer systems
- List of Soviet microprocessors
- List of Russian IT developers
- List of Russian microprocessors
- List of computer hardware manufacturers in the Soviet Union
- Internet in Russia
- Information technology in Russia
