= List of Russian microprocessors =

External videos
- on semiconductor industry YouTube Channel(in Russian)
- 『The future of Russian microelectronics』 on YouTube(in Russian)
- 『All about Russian Processors』 on YouTube(in Russian)

This is the list of Russian microprocessors, sorted by manufacturer

MCST

- Elbrus 2000 – implements VLIW architecture, 300 MHz clock rate, developed by MCST
- Elbrus-S
- Elbrus-1S+ – single-core evolution of Elbrus 2000 SoC, 1000 MHz clock rate + GPU
- Elbrus-2S+ – dual-core evolution of Elbrus 2000, 500 MHz clock rate + four DSP cores (ELcore-09)
- Elbrus-2SM – dual-core evolution of Elbrus 2000, 300 MHz clock rate
- Elbrus-4S – quad-core evolution of Elbrus 2000, 800 MHz clock rate
- Elbrus-8S – octa-core evolution of Elbrus 2000, 1.3 GHz clock rate
- MCST-R150
- MCST-R500
- MCST-R500S – SPARC V8 dual-core 500 MHz
- MCST-R1000 – SPARC V9 quad-core 1 GHz
- MCST-4R – 64-bit, 4-core, 2w in-order superscalar, implements SPARC V9 instruction set architecture (ISA), 1000 MHz clock rate, developed by MCST

ELVEES

ELVEES Multicore – multicore hybrid of RISC and DSP

- 1892VM3T, (Russian: 1892ВМ3Т (MC-12)) – 1 RISC core + 1 DSP core ELcore-14
- 1892VM2Ya, (Russian: 1892ВМ2Я (MC-24)) – 1 RISC core + 1 DSP ELcore-24
- 1892VM5Ya, (Russian: 1892ВМ5Я (МС-0226, ЦПОС-02)) – 1 RISC core + 2 DSP cores (ELcore-26)
- 1892VM4Ya, (Russian: 1892ВМ4Я (MC-0226G, МЦОС)) – 1 RISC core + 2 DSP cores (ELcore-26)
- NVCom-01
- NVCom-02 in versions 1892VM11Ya (1892ВМ11Я, NVCom-02) and 1892VM2Ya (1892ВМ10Я, NVCom-02T)

NIISI

KOMDIV-32 – 32-bit, implements the MIPS I instruction set architecture (ISA), compatible with MIPS R3000, 90 MHz clock rate

- KOMDIV-64 (1890VM5) – 64-bit, 2-way in-order superscalar, implements the MIPS IV instruction set architecture (ISA), 350 MHz clock rate
- KOMDIV128-RIO – coprocessor

NTC Module

NeuroMatrix – digital signal processor (DSP) series

- NM6403 – dual-core microprocessor VLIW/SIMD architecture, two main units of 32-bit RISC and 64-bit vector co-processor.
- NM6404
- NMC – 64-bit RISC/DSP
- NMRC – 32/64-bit RISC

Multiclet – post von Neumann, multicellular microprocessor

MultiClet P1 – multicellular

- MultiClet R1 – multicellular, dynamically reconfigurable

Baikal Electronics

- Baikal T1 – dual-core MIPS32, 1.2 GHz clock rate
- Baikal-M BE-M1000 – octa-core ARM64, 1.5 GHz clock rate
- Baikal-S BE-S1000 – 48-core ARM64, 2.5 GHz clock rate

TYPHOON

- Typhoon multicore – multicore hybrid of TRIPS + MultiCells architecture
  - Series Typhoon - Russian: – 16 cells core. Superscalar, implements ISA "Typhoon"

JSC NPC "ELVIS" was the first in the Russian Federation to implement SpaceWire network interfaces, as well as GigaSpaceWire and SpaceFibre gigabit interfaces as part of processor and switch microcircuits, which have found wide application in various equipment. JSC Scientific and Production Center "ELVIS" has developed more than 50 types of various microcircuits and systems on a crystal with design standards of 16 nm, 28 nm, 40 nm, 65 nm, 130 nm, 180 nm, 250 nm. Currently, JSC NPC "ELVIS" designs microcircuits using 16-28 nm technologies and is ready to master the design technology according to 6 nm standards.

== See also ==
- List of Soviet microprocessors
