= Baikal CPU =

Russian microprocessor

Baikal T1
General information
- Launched: 2015; 11 years ago
- Designed by: Baikal Electronics

Performance
- Max. CPU clock rate: 1.2 MHz to 2.4 GHz

Physical specifications
- Cores: 2

Architecture and classification
- Instruction set: MIPS32

Baikal CPU is a line of MIPS, RISC-V and ARM-based microprocessors developed by fabless design firm Baikal Electronics, a spin-off of the Russian supercomputer company T-Platforms.

== Design ==
Judging by the information available from online sources Baikal Electronics have selected a different approach compared to other Russian microprocessor initiatives such as the Elbrus-2SM, Elbrus-8S by MCST, and the Multiclet line of chips. The design by Baikal Electronics is based on existing commercial IP Cores from Imagination Technologies and ARM Holdings, compared to the more innovative approach of Multiclet, and the Elbrus CPU which has a history dating back to the Elbrus supercomputers from the Soviet Union.

== Company's history ==
The Baikal Electronics company was established on January 11, 2012, as a daughter entity of T-Platforms and was registered as a public joint-stock company. T-NANO, a future investor in Baikal Electronics, registered on march 3, 2012 as a joint venture of T-Platformi (50.5%) and the Russian Direct Investment Fund (49.5%).

In May 2012 Grigoriy Khrenov joined the company as the CTO. He is D.Sc. and formerly had been a Deputy Chief Designer at Micron Technology, then an Engineering Director at Cadence Design Systems.

In June 2021 Varton acquired a controling share of Baikal Electronics.

In August 2021 TSMC was contracted for chip production, but such production was banned by sanctions adopted in the aftermath of Russia's invasion of Ukraine.

In August 2023, Baikal Electronics entered bankruptcy.

=== US sanctions, MIPS architecture chosen ===
Since March 8, 2013, the parent company T-Platforms was placed under US sanctions, which suspended the planned licensing agreement with ARM Ltd. Soon, on March 23, the ownership structure was changed: T-Platforms got 37.17%, Rusnano through the Russian Direct Investment Fund - 62.83%. For the first processor being developed (Baikal-T1 or BE-T1000) MIPS architecture by Imagination Technologies and 28 nm process were chosen. On December 31, 2013, US sanctions were lifted and a Technology License Agreement with ARM Ltd. was arranged on February 20, 2014.

On may 27, 2014 T-Nano formally became an investor in the development, production and sales of Baikal processors in a tri-party agreement between T-Nano, Baikal Electronics and T-Platforms. The exact amount invested is unknown, however, T-Nano received 1.2B rubles upon its creation and T-Platforms had plans for 800M invested.

In June, 2014 T-Nano received 25% + 1 shares of the company while T-Platforms' part decreased to 75% - 1 shares.

March, 2015, Synopsys Inc. announced that Baikal Electronics has selected Synopsys Solutions to accelerate design and verification of their advanced System on chips.

May, 2015, Baikal Electronics and Imagination Technologies announced that the first commercial Baikal microprocessor will be based on the MIPS Warrior P5600, and it will be called Baikal-T1. The first samples of the new CPU will be available starting from June, 2015.

=== ARM architecture, Baikal-M ===
Following this agreement in 2014 the company initiated the development of its second processor Baikal-M. This had a backing of Minpromtorg, Russia's Ministry of Trade. Several models were planned for 2015: 8-core Baikal-M, Baikal-M/2 (Baikal-M lite) to be used in personal computers and small servers, based on the ARM Cortex A-57 core at 28 nm, while by the end of 2016 a more advanced server-ready 16-core model at 16 nm was conceived.

The total cost assumed was 2.3 billion rubles, of which 1.1 billion was allocated by the government. The roadmap aimed for sales to start by May, 2018.

On May 15, 2015, Baikal Electronics was granted two licenses from the state security certification center (part of FSB), permitting development and distribution of cryptographic, data exchange and telecommunications systems (0011055 14287Н and 0012494 14964Н), which was compulsory for further development.

=== Baikal-T1 practical applications ===
On May 25, 2015, a CNC unit “Resurs-30”, co-authored by AO Stankoprom and T-Platformi and based on the Baikal-T1 processor was revealed.

First engineering samples of Baikal-T1 arrived on May 26, 2015.

On August 31, 2015, an investment loan of M500 rubles was procured by the Council of the Industry Development Fund to be used to secure the production of T1 processor. Total expenses were projected around M778 rubles, with M278 to be invested by T-Platformi.

In September, 2015 Chinese Lenovo declared a memorandum of cooperation and announced a series of computers based on Baikals with the ThinkCentre Tiny-in-one 23 built on T1. However, little came out of these plans beyond the declaration.

=== M500 rubles of subsidies and 5 million processors planned ===
On November 6, 2015, Baikal Electronics was contracted by the state Russian Fund of Technology Development (the former name for the Fund for Industry Development) under the federal procurement program “Development of Electronic Components Production and Radio Electronics for 2008-2015” by the Trade Ministry. The ending date was set on November 6, 2020, with the goal beyond 5 million processors by year 2020.

In January 2016 the company declared a capacity to develop and ready for production two series of ARM processors on 28 nm node, and by the end of 2017 another one on 16 nm.

On July 8, 2016, the all-business register Spark-Interfax updated the Baikal’s ownership from Public Share Company to Private Company, and the enterprise no longer reported on its activities.

On September 12, 2016, a multi-function printer based on Baikal-T1 was announced. The project’s status was unknown as of August, 2021.

The development of server processor Baikal-S was started in October, 2016.

=== Domestic product status ===
On November 26, 2016 Baikal-T1 received the status of a domestic integrated circuit in accordance with the Government Act 719 from July 17, 2015.

On February 27, 2017, the production achievement of the Baikal-T1 received a “Development Award” by the state bank VEB RF.

=== Further T1 production, sales and engineering boards ===
By march 28, 2017 a second batch of production Baikal-T1 processors was ready.

In April, 2018 engineering boards BFK3.1 went on sale with Baikal-T1s, and since June 1, 2018, the processors were made available separately for 3,990 rubles.

Development of Baikal-M was completed in 2018 having missed the intended date by a year, but being able to produce the first engineering sample.

Baikal-M demo was first performed for the state owned entities on October 2, 2019, and then for the general public on October 22, 2019.

On November 18, 2019, the company disclosed it was intending to start mass production of server Baikal-S part by the end of 2020.

=== Additional funding with 2.2 billion rubles ===
According to the Spark-Interfax Business Register, by the end of 2019 the company had received 2.2 billion rubles of subsidies from the Trade Ministry. Overall subsidies amounted to around 5 billion rubles.

On February 11, 2020, a trial installation of industrial equipment based on Baikal-T1 at select Gazprom nodes was announced.

=== Breach of timeframe lawsuit, Varton group interference ===
On August 24, 2020, the Trade Ministry filed a lawsuit against the company for the alleged failure of production of Baikal-M processors (ARM-based) requesting M500.5 rubles of subsidies be reimbursed. However, on December 10, 2020, the motion was dismissed by the primary jurisdiction court.

On October 27, 2020, a possible sale of 60% of stake to Varton group was announced, valued at B4 rubles. Since the announcement Varton Group has been playing a significant role in management decisions.

=== Domestic product level 2, TSMC production ===
On October 30, 2020, the Ministry of Trade marked Baikal-M as grade 2 domestic product referencing the Government Act 719 from June 17, 2015.

On November 27, 2020, the company placed an order for 130 000 processors with TSMC and was planning to add 100 000 more in December 2020, and an extra 100 000 in the 1st quarter of 2021.

The first shipments from the 130 000 batch were expected to start in the III quarter of 2021. However, these did not materialize by September 2021, the company stating the disruption of the supply chain due to the coronavirus pandemic and the global chip shortage as a cause.

=== New processors M/2, M/2+, S ===
On November 30, 2020 CEO Andrey Yevdokomov presented three new processors: Baikal-M/2 (Baikal-M lite), Baikal-M/2+ (Baikal-M lite+) and Baikal-S.

The “light” M/2 and M/2+ versions targeted a 28 nm process for its 64-bit cores ARM Cortex-A57. All new processors were to get 512 KB of cache for each core, one DDR3/DDR4 memory controller, Mali-T628 graphics IP, PCIe Gen3 (4+4+4 lanes) and SATA III (6 GB/s) interface.

However, Baikal-S targeted a finer 16 nm process, having as many as 48 cores ARM Cortex-A75 clocked at 2 GHz.

=== Acquisition by Varton Group ===
By June 2021 the T-platforms closed the sale of their share, the buyer Varton Group received over 70% of the company’s capital.

=== Production plans, personal computers developed ===
July 2, 2021 marked the start of a new strategy, confirmed by the board of directors, aiming to invest B23 rubles in the processor development up until 2025. The Baikal-M/2 plans were confirmed, while Baikal-M/2+ (Baikal-M lite+) was canceled. The company also disclosed the plans for an Armv9 Baikal-M2 aimed for desktops and all-in-ones, Baikal-L for notebooks and tablets, Baikal-S2 for data storage devices, servers and supercomputers. The process fidelity sought was 12 to 6 nm. The financing was to be provided with the company's own funds, as well as loans and federal subsidies.

By the end of July 2021 the company placed and paid for a batch of Baikal-S processors with Taiwanese TSMC fab.

On August 9, 2021, Russian computer manufacturer iRU announced mass production of computers based on the Baikal-M processor.

As of June 2021 the company employed 120 of staff, about 60% of whom were chip and electronic hardware developers and production specialists.

=== Product tests ===
On October, 20th, 2017 an announcement reported on the successful completion of the battery of tests of Baikal-T1 in the research center by FGUP “Mytishchinskie Research and Science Institute of Radioelectric Devices”, having measured the parameters and functional control under harsh climatic conditions: heat up to +70 °C, cooling to −60 °C, moisture, fungi and other.

On December 17, 2021, the company presented a 48-core (ARM Cortex-A75) server processor Baikal-S at its annual reporting conference. The first run on a test motherboard was performed on October, 28th, successfully booting a Linux-like operating system. Coremark, Whetstone and 7zip tests showed “acceptably high results”, according to the developers. The chip never entered mass production.

=== Bankruptcy ===
In August 2023 T-Platforms declared its bankruptcy and auctioning of its assets, which were estimated at only $5 million. The declaration followed court ruling in October 2022, company's own filing for bankruptcy in 2021 and period of administration. As the main factor leading to insolvency were named the attempts of Russian government to replace Western products with domestic ones.

== Baikal-T1 ==
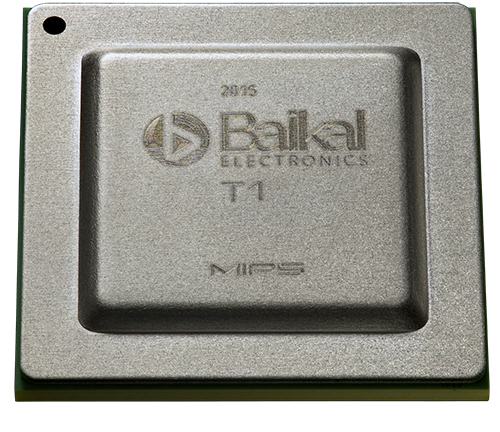
The Baikal-T1 CPU.

The Baikal-T1 mainly targets applications for networking and industrial automation, with features such as hardware support for virtualization and a high performance 128-bit SIMD engine.

Produced	2015
Process	CMOS 28 nm
Clock rate	up to 1,2 GHz
Cores	2
Cache	1 MB L2 cache
Memory	DDR3
Mass storage	SATA, 6 Gbit/s
Connectivity	Two 1 Gigabit Ethernet; One 10 Gigabit Ethernet; USB 2.0; PCI Express 3.0 x4; GPIO, I2C, UART and SPI
Package size	25×25 mm
Power consumption	5 W

March, 2016 it was announced on the Imagination Technologies blog that a desktop PC called the Tavolga Terminal, also known as the Meadowsweet Terminal PC is available to order from T-Platforms. The computer is based on the Baikal-T1 CPU, SM750 Graphics processing unit and the Debian Linux as the operating system.

== Baikal-M BE-M1000 ==
In October 2021, Baikal Electronics announced that it had started shipping the BE-M1000, a System on a Chip with eight ARM Cortex-A57 cores, an 8-core Mali-T628 GPU, HDMI, PCI Express, 10 Gb Ethernet and SATA. The CPUs are made by TSMC in a 28 nm process. Baikal Electronics plans to ship 15.000 CPUs per month, mostly to Russian state-owned companies running government-approved software such as Astra Linux.

== Baikal-S BE-S1000 ==
On 17 December 2021, Baikal-S server processor with 48 ARM Cortex-A75 cores was presented at the annual final conference of Baikal Electronics. The first launch of the debug board with an engineering instance of Baikal-S was made on 28 October: a Linux-like operating system was launched. According to the results of Coremark, Whetstone and 7zip parameters testing, Baikal-S showed, according to the developers' words, "quite high results". Some photos of Baikal-S processor and die became available in good quality.

== Baikal-U BE-U1000 ==
In December 2025, Baikal Electronics announced the serial production of the BE-U1000, a three-core RISC-V general-purpose microcontroller for industrial applications.
