= List of Russian IT developers =

This list of Russian IT developers includes hardware engineers, computer scientists and programmers from the Russian Empire, the Soviet Union and the Russian Federation.

See also Category:Russian computer scientists and Category:Russian computer programmers.

== Alphabetical list ==
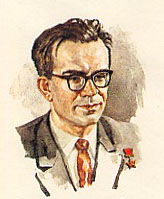
Glushkov

=== A ===
- Georgy Adelson-Velsky, inventor of AVL tree algorithm, developer of Kaissa (the first World Computer Chess Champion)
- Andrey Andreev, creator of Badoo, one of the world's largest dating sites, and the 10th largest social network in the world
- Vladimir Arlazarov, DBS Ines, developer of Kaissa (the first World Computer Chess Champion)

=== B ===
- Boris Babayan, developer of the Elbrus-series supercomputers, founder of Moscow Center of SPARC Technologies (MCST)
- Alexander Brudno, described the alpha-beta (α-β) search algorithm
- Nikolay Brusentsov, inventor of the ternary computer (Setun)

=== C ===
- Andrei Chernov, one of the founders of the Russian Internet and the creator of KOI8-R character encoding
- Alexey Chervonenkis, developed the Vapnik–Chervonenkis theory, also known as the "fundamental theory of learning", a key part of computational learning theory

=== D ===
- Mikhail Donskoy, a leading developer of Kaissa, the first computer chess champion
- Pavel Durov, founded the VKontakte.ru social network, #35 on Alexa's Top 500 Most Visited Global Websites, the 6th largest social network in the world, and Telegram

=== E ===
- Andrey Ershov, developed Rapira programming language, started the predecessor to the Russian National Corpus

=== G ===
- Vadim Gerasimov, one of the original co-developers of the famous video game Tetris
- Victor Glushkov, a founder of cybernetics, inventor of the first personal computer, MIR

=== K ===
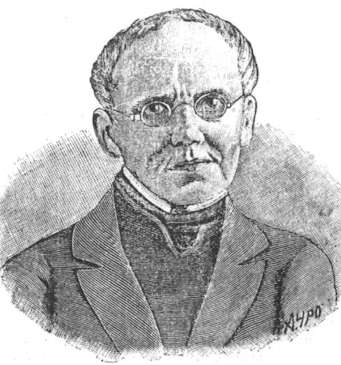
Korsakov

- Yevgeny Kaspersky, developer of Kaspersky antivirus products
- Anatoly Karatsuba, developed the Karatsuba algorithm (the first fast multiplication algorithm)
- Leonid Khachiyan, developed the Ellipsoid algorithm for linear programming
- Tigran Khudaverdyan, deputy CEO of Yandex
- Lev Korolyov, co-developed the first Soviet computers
- Semen Korsakov, first to use punched cards for information storage and search
- Alexander Kronrod, developer of Gauss–Kronrod quadrature formula and Kaissa, the first world computer chess champion
- Nikita Kolesnikov, developer of the video game Hello Neighbor

=== L ===
- Evgenii Landis, inventor of AVL tree algorithm
- Sergey Lebedev, developer of the first Soviet and European electronic computers, MESM and BESM
- Vladimir Levenshtein, developed the Levenshtein automaton, Levenshtein coding and Levenshtein distance
- Leonid Levin, IT scientist, developed the Cook–Levin theorem (the foundation for computational complexity)
- Oleg Lupanov, coined the term "Shannon effect"; developed the (k, s)-Lupanov representation of Boolean functions

=== M ===
- Yuri Matiyasevich, solved Hilbert's tenth problem
- Alexander Mikhailov, coined the term "informatics"
- Anatoly Morozov, worked on automated control systems, problem-focused complexes, modelling, and situational management

=== N ===
- Anton Nossik, godfather of the Russian internet who began Russian online news

=== P ===
- Alexey Pajitnov, inventor of Tetris
- Victor Pan, worked in the area of polynomial computations
- Igor Pavlov, creator of the file archiver 7-Zip; creator of the 7z archive format
- Svyatoslav Pestov, developer of jEdit text editor and Factor programming language
- Vladimir Pokhilko, specialized in human–computer interaction
- Yuriy Polyakov, developed an approximate method for nonlinear differential and integrodifferential equations

=== R ===
- Bashir Rameev, developer of Strela, the first mainframe computer manufactured serially in the Soviet Union
- Alexander Razborov, won the Nevanlinna Prize for introducing the "approximation method" in proving Boolean circuit lower bounds of some essential algorithmic problems, and the Gödel Prize for the paper "Natural Proofs"
- Eugene Roshal, developer of the Far Manager, RAR file format and WinRAR file archiver

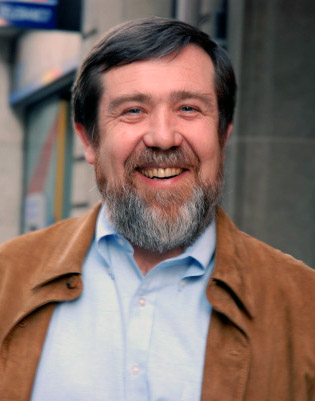
Pajitnov

=== S ===
- Ilya Segalovich, founder and one of the first programmers of Yandex, Russian search engine
- Anatoly Shalyto, initiator of the Foundation for Open Project Documentation; developed Automata-based programming
- Dmitry Sklyarov, computer programmer known for his 2001 arrest by American law enforcement; United States v. Elcom Ltd.
- Alexander Stepanov, created and implemented the C++ Standard Template Library
- Igor Sysoev, creator of nginx, the popular high performance web server, and founder of NGINX, Inc.

=== T ===
- Andrey Terekhov (Терехов, Андрей Николаевич), developer of the ALGOL 68 programming language; telecommunication systems
- Andrey Ternovskiy, creator of Chatroulette
- Valentin Turchin, inventor of the Refal programming language, introduced metasystem transition and supercompilation

=== V ===
- Vladimir Vapnik, developed the theory of the support vector machine; demonstrated its performance on a number of problems of interest to the machine learning community, including handwriting recognition

=== Y ===
- Sergey Yablonsky, founder of the Soviet school of mathematical cybernetics and discrete mathematics

== See also ==
- List of computer scientists
- List of pioneers in computer science
- List of programmers
- Information technology
- List of Russian inventors
