= Vladimir Pentkovski =

Soviet-American computer scientist

Vladimir Mstislavovich Pentkovski
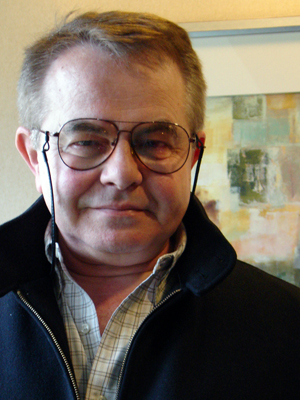
- Vladimir Mstislavovich Pentkovski
- Born: March 18, 1946; Moscow, Soviet Union
- Died: December 24, 2012 (aged 66); Folsom, California, United States

Vladimir Mstislavovich Pentkovski (Russian: Владимир Мстиславович Пентковский; March 18, 1946 – December 24, 2012) was a Soviet-American computer scientist, a graduate of the Moscow Institute of Physics and Technology and winner of the highest former Soviet Union's USSR State Prize (1987). He was one of the leading architects of the Soviet Elbrus supercomputers and the high-level programming language El-76. At the beginning of 1990s, he immigrated to the United States where he worked at Intel and led the team that developed the architecture for the Pentium III processor. According to a popular legend, Pentium processors were named after Vladimir Pentkovski.

== Biography ==
Pentkovski was born in Moscow, USSR, into the family of the mathematician Mstislav Pentkovskii (1911–1968), Doctor of Physical and Mathematical Sciences, full professor (1955), full member of The National Academy of Sciences of the Republic of Kazakhstan (1958), the author of the specific nomogram's application in the engineering.

After graduation from the Moscow Institute of Physics and Technology (1970), completed his PhD and Doctorate of Science. From 1970 to 1992 Pentkovski worked at the Lebedev Institute of Precision Mechanics and Computer Engineering designing the supercomputers Elbrus-1 and Elbrus-2 and leading the development of the high-level programming language El-76.

Starting in 1986, he led the research and development of the 32-bit microprocessor El-90 which combined the concept of RISC and Elbrus-2 architecture. The logical design of El-90 processor was finished by 1987, with the prototype launched in 1990. At the same time Pentkovski started designing El-91C microprocessor based on El-90 design, but the project was closed due to the changes to Russian political and economic systems.

In February 1993 Pentkovski started his career at Intel and rose to the level of Senior Principal Engineer. He focused mainly on CPU architecture, working on several generations of x86 from single-core to multi-core to many-core. Since the beginning of 2000s he was leading the Russian CPU development team on a new processor Vector Instruction Pointer (VIP) architecture.

In 2010, under Pentkovski's leadership, Intel and the Moscow Institute of Physics and Technology (MIPT) won the contest of university proposals to launch major world-class research initiatives with the participation of prominent international scientists, conducted by the Ministry of Education and Science of the Russian Federation and received a grant of 150 million rubles. A team of Intel engineers, led by Pentkovski in collaboration with MIPT researchers, launched a lab targeting research and development of computer-intensive applications. Primarily, the lab iSCALARE was focused on problem-oriented, highly parallel hardware and software architectures for bioinformatics, drug design, and pharmaceuticals.

After Pentkovski's death in 2012, he was survived by his two children: his son Mstislav Pentkovsky, who works as an opera stage director at the Mariinsky Theatre, and his daughter Maria Pentkovski. His final resting place is in Folsom, California.

== Selected publications ==
- Пентковский В. М. Автокод Эльбрус. Эль-76. Принципы построения языка и руководство к использованию [Pentkovskii V.M. Avtokod el'brus: printsipy postroeniia iazyka i rukovodstvo k pol'zovaniiu] под редакцией Ершова А. П. – М.: Наука, 1982. – 352 с. – OCLC 22953931.
- Пентковский В. М. Язык программирования Эль-76. Принципы построения языка и руководство к пользованию. – 2-е изд, испр. и доп. – М.: Наука, 1989. – 364 с. – ISBN 5-02-013982-3.
- Paul M. Zagacki, Deep Buch, Emile Hsieh, Daniel Melaku, Vladimir M. Pentkovski, Hsien-Hsin S. Lee: Architecture of a 3D Software Stack for Peak Pentium III Processor Performance. // Intel Technology Journal. – 1999. – Т. 3. – No. 2.
- Jagannath Keshava and Vladimir Pentkovski: Pentium® III Processor Implementation Tradeoffs. // Intel Technology Journal. – 1999. – Т. 3. – No. 2.
- Srinivas K. Raman, Vladimir M. Pentkovski, Jagannath Keshava: Implementing Streaming SIMD Extensions on the Pentium III Processor. // IEEE Micro, Volume 20, Number 1, January/February 2000: 47–57 (2000)
- Deep K. Buch, Vladimir M. Pentkovski: Experience of Characterization of Typical Multi-Tier e-Business System Using Operational Analysis. / 27th International Computer Measurement Group Conference, 2001: 671–682.
- https://www.mariinsky.ru/en/company/stagedirectors/andrea_de_rosa1

== Patents ==
- Shared cache structure for temporal and non-temporal instructions
- Efficient utilization of write-combining buffers
- Pipelined processing of short data streams using data prefetching
- Processing polygon meshes using mesh pool window
- System and method for cache sharing
- Method and apparatus for shared cache coherency for a chip multiprocessor or multiprocessor system Method and apparatus for floating point operations and format conversion operations
- Multiprocessor-scalable streaming data server arrangement
- Method and apparatus for performing cache segment flush and cache segment invalidation operations
- Method and system for efficient handlings of serial and parallel java operations
- Selective interrupt delivery to multiple processors having independent operating systems
- Executing partial-width packed data instructions Method and apparatus for processing 2D operations in a tiled graphics architecture
- Method and apparatus for mapping address space of integrated programmable devices within host system memory
- Method and apparatus for efficiently processing vertex information in a video graphics system
- Method and apparatus for prefetching data into cache
- Conversion between packed floating point data and packed 32-bit integer data in different architectural registers
- Conversion from packed floating point data to packed 8-bit integer data in different architectural registers
