= Information technology in Russia =

The information technology sector in Russia employed around 300,000 people in 2012, and contributed 1.2% of the country's GDP in 2015. The sector is concentrated in the cities of Moscow and Saint Petersburg.

== History ==
The Russian IT sector drew comparatively little from Soviet-era institutions. Russian IT companies were started in the early 1990s by founders with an academic background seeking to find a place in the new market economy. Piracy was widespread in the country, with an estimated 90% of all software in Russia being pirated in 1997.

In the 1990s, companies such as Vist began assembling computers out of foreign-made components, targeting small businesses and families who could not afford foreign brands like IBM and Compaq. DVM Computer gained some traction in the laptop market with its RoverBook brand. The Russian Computer Association (Российская компьютерная ассоциация) was the trade association representing the sector. In 1997 Yandex was established in Moscow.

In 1999 MCST developed the Elbrus 2000 processor, which was initially hyped as an Itanium killer, but the project was hampered by a chronic lack of funding.

Over time, Russian companies moved to software development, an activity which enjoyed higher margins. Local companies cater to the specific needs of the Russian market, such as ERP software developed by 1C Company with a focus on Russian accounting rules. Kaspersky Labs is described as the flagship company of the Russian IT industry. Exports of software and IT services from Russia reached $7 billion in 2015, up from $2.8 billion in 2009.

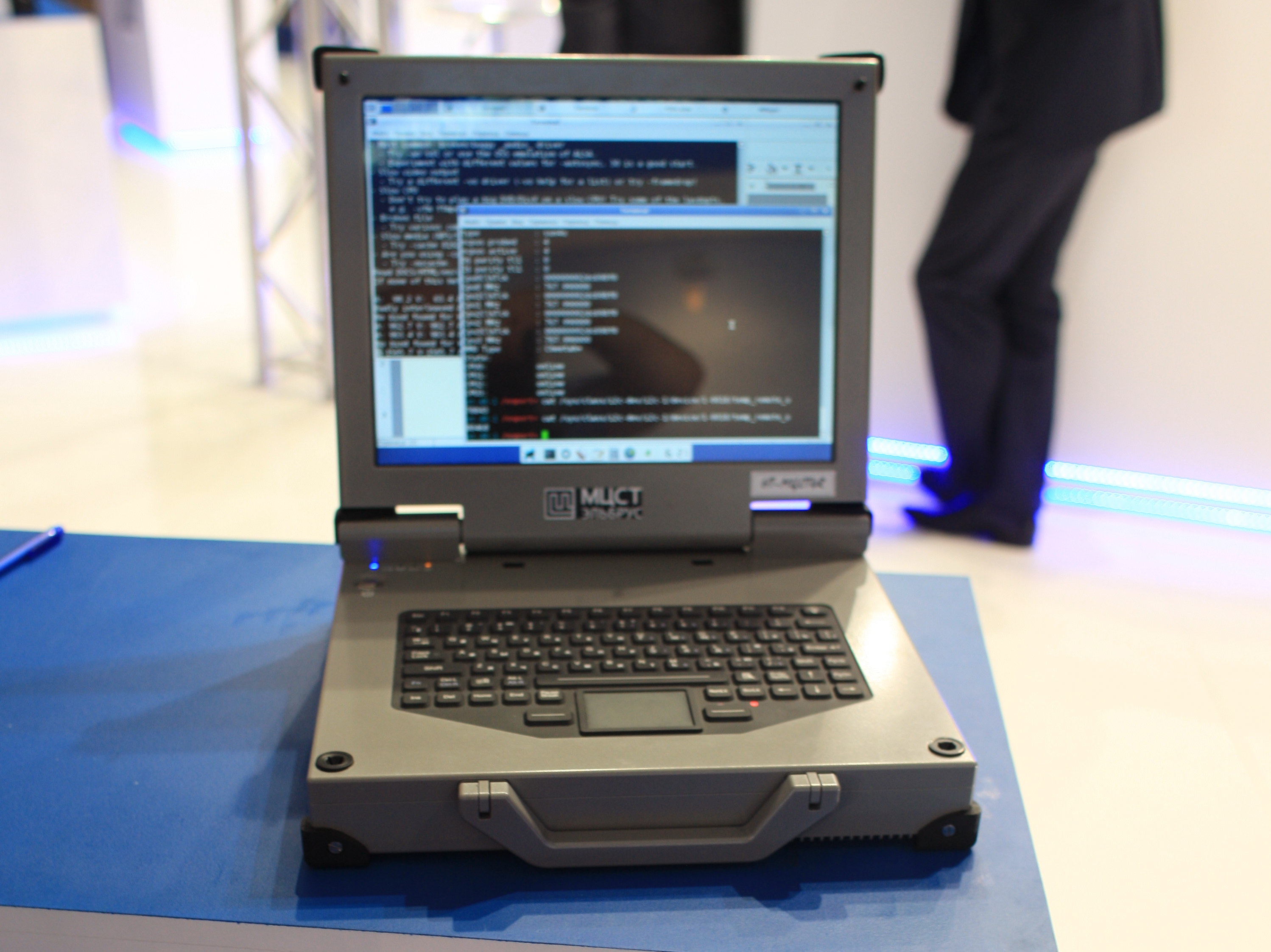
MCST Elbrus HT-R1000 laptop

In 2012 MCST launched the NT-ElbrusS, a rugged laptop for military applications.

After the start of the War in Donbas and the Russian annexation of Crimea, the Ukrainian government banned a number of Russian IT companies from conducting business in the country.

In June 2015 the Russian parliament passed a law to establish a preference system for software developed in Russia.

Worsening relations between the United States and Russia have led some to advocate a purge of Russian software.

== Largest Internet companies ==
List of the largest internet companies based in Russia in 2025, according to the analytical agency Smart Ranking.

Rank	Name	Subsidiaries	Established	Headquarters
1	Yandex	Kinopoisk	1997	Moscow
2	T-Bank		2006	Moscow
3	Wildberries		2004	Moscow
4	Ozon		1998	Moscow
5	Rostelecom		1993	Moscow
6	Sber	2GIS	1991	Moscow
7	MTS		1993	Moscow
8	Avito		2007	Moscow
9	T1 IT		1992	Moscow
10	VK		1998	Moscow
11	ICS Holding	Bureau 1440	2018	Moscow
12	Isource		2019	Moscow
13	Softline		1993	Moscow
14	Lamoda		2011	Moscow
15	ER-Telecom		2001	Perm
16	1C Company		1991	Moscow
17	Rosatom		2007	Moscow
18	Kaspersky Lab		1997	Moscow
19	Telematika		2015	Moscow
20	Rubytech		2020	Moscow
21	Sitronics		1997	Moscow
22	SKB Kontur		1988	Yekaterinburg
23	HeadHunter		2000	Moscow
24	Jet Infosystems		1991	Moscow
25	League of Digital Economy		2007	Moscow

== See also ==
- List of Russian IT developers
