= Elbrus (computer) =

Line of Soviet and Russian computer systems

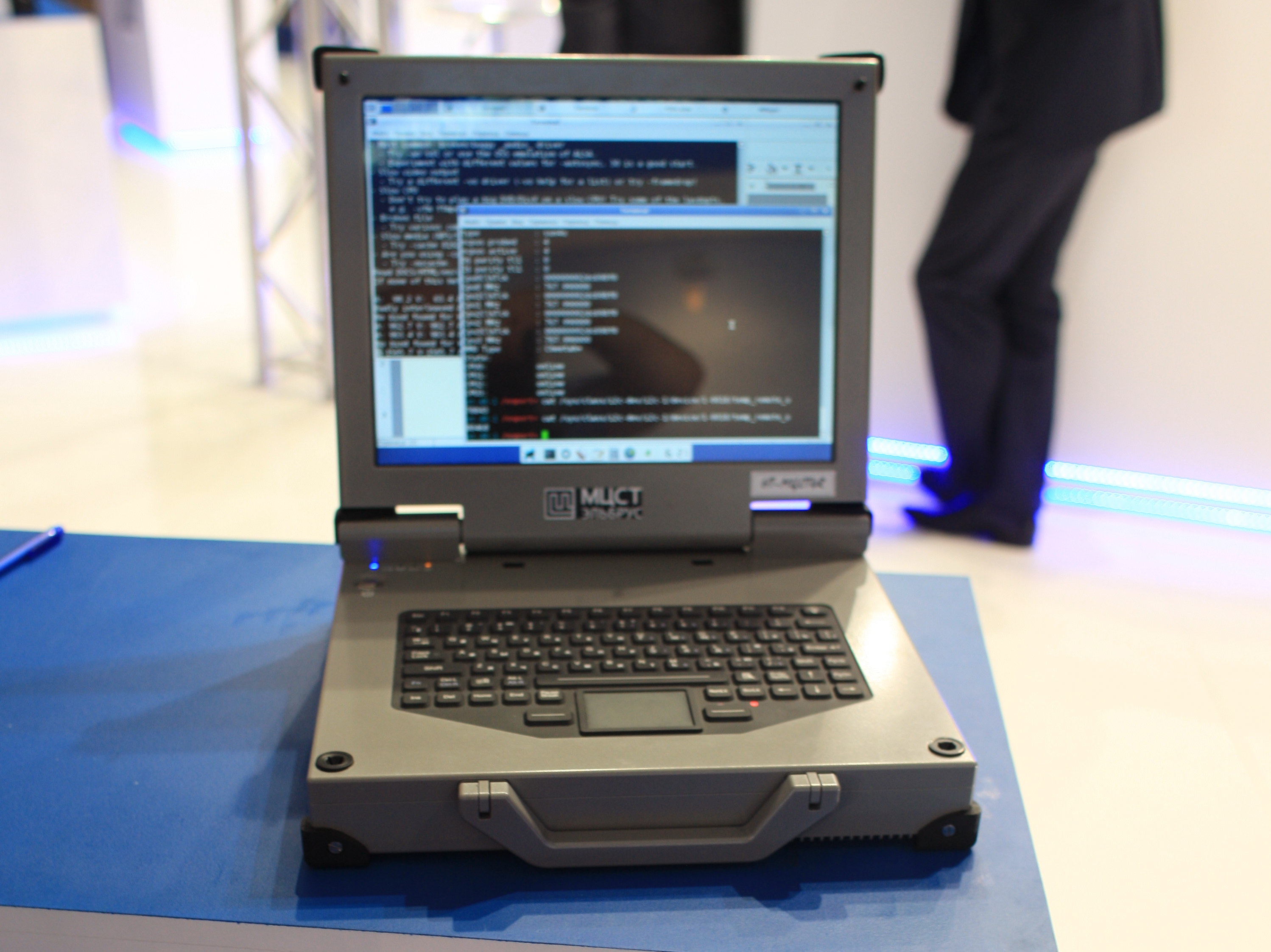
- Moscow Center of SPARC Technologies designed a laptop for military and industrial purpose.
- Developer: LIPMCE; MCST
- Released: 1979

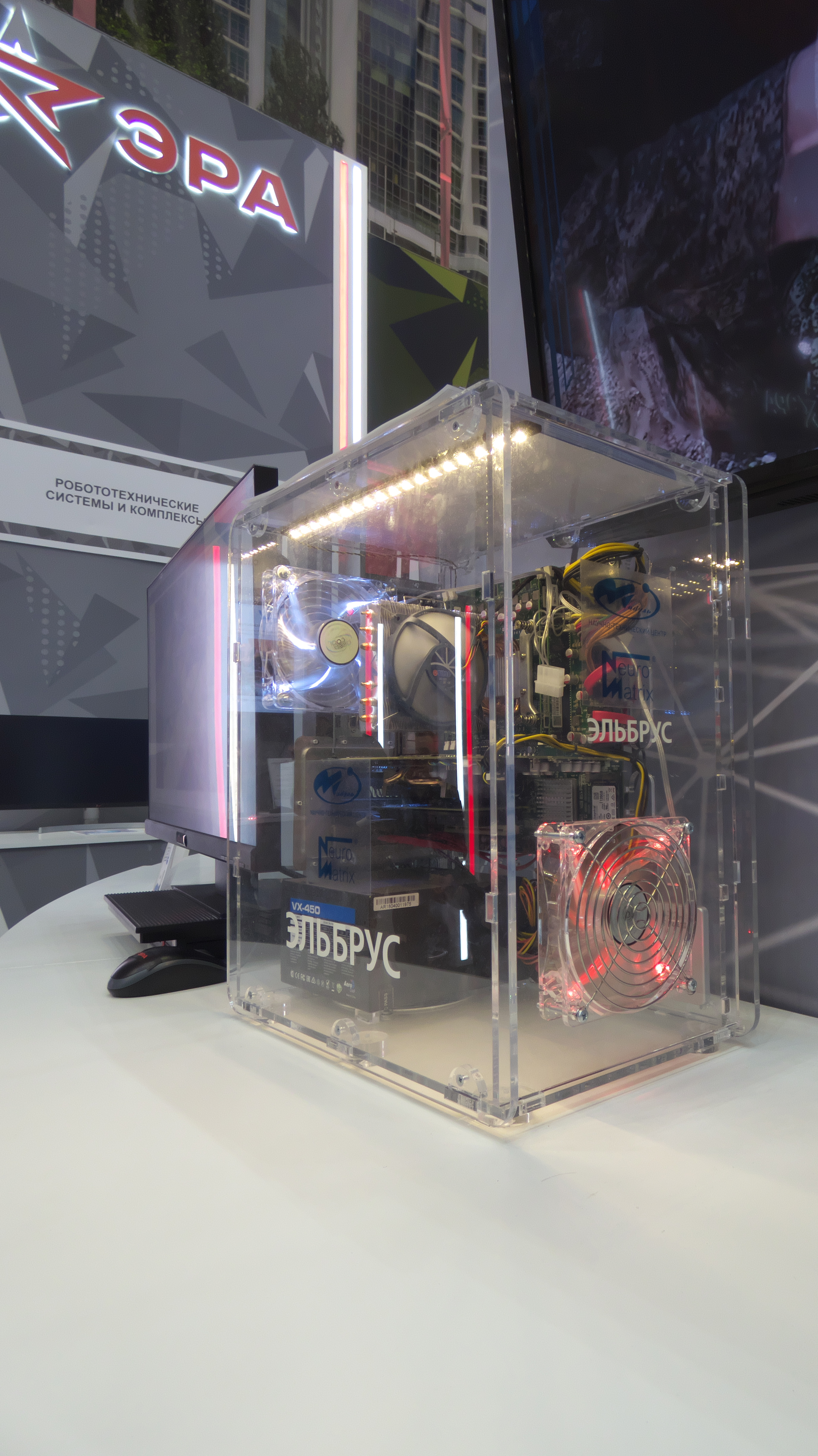
Elbrus personal computer during the Armiya 2022 exhibition.

The Elbrus (Russian: Эльбрус) is a line of Soviet and Russian computer systems developed by the Lebedev Institute of Precision Mechanics and Computer Engineering. These computers are used in the space program, nuclear weapons research, and defense systems, as well as for theoretical and researching purposes, such as an experimental Refal and CLU translators.

== History ==
Historically, computers under the Elbrus brand comprised several different instruction set architectures (ISAs).

The first of them was the line of the large fourth-generation computers, developed by Vsevolod Burtsev. These were heavily influenced by the Burroughs large systems and similarly to them implemented tagged architecture and a variant of ALGOL-68 as system programming language.

After that Burtsev retired, and new Lebedev's chief developer, Boris Babayan, introduced the completely new system architecture. Differing completely from the architecture of both Elbrus 1 and Elbrus 2, it employed a very long instruction word (VLIW) approach.

In 1992, a spin-off company Moscow Center of SPARC Technologies (MCST) was created and continued development, using the "Elbrus" moniker as a brand for all computer systems developed by the company.

In the late 1990s, a series of SPARC-based central processing units (CPUs) were developed at MCST as a way to raise funds for in-house semiconductor intellectual property core development and to fill the niche of domestically-developed CPUs for the backdoor-wary military.

In June 2024, a new computer based on the “Elbrus-2S3 (Эльбрус-2С3) microprocessor” was developed by Roselektronika.

In September 2024, The MCST company presented “Elbrus-2S3 (Эльбрус-2С3) microprocessor” at the 10th anniversary Russian forum "Microelectronics 2024".

In December 2024, Programmable logic controllers "PLC-Elbrus (based on the Elbrus-2S3 microprocessor) " of the holding company "Rostec Electronics" of the State Corporation Rostec have passed state registration and are included in the register of software and hardware complexes of the Ministry of Digital Development of the Russian Federation. This allows using the devices at critical information infrastructure facilities to create automated process control systems.

== Models ==
Elbrus models

Elbrus-4S

Elbrus-8S

Elbrus-8SV

- Elbrus 1 (1979) was the first in the line.
  - A side development was an update of the 1965 BESM-6 as Elbrus-1K2.
  - a 10-processor computer, with superscalar, out-of-order execution and reduced instruction set computer (RISC) processors.
- Elbrus 2 (1984)
  - Re-implementation of the Elbrus 1 architecture with faster emitter-coupled logic (ECL) chips.
- Elbrus 3 (1990) was a 16-processor computer developed by the Babayan's team, and one of the first VLIW computers in the world.
- Elbrus 2000 (2001) was a microprocessor development of the Elbrus 3 architecture. Also known as Elbrus-S.
  - Elbrus-3M1 (2005) is a two-processor computer based on Elbrus 2000 microprocessor working at 300 MHz.
  - Elbrus МВ3S1/C (2009) is a ccNUMA four-processor computer based on Elbrus-S microprocessor working at 500 MHz.
- Elbrus-2S+ (2011) working at 500 MHz, with capacity to calculate 16 GFlops.
- Elbrus-2SM (2014) working at 300 MHz, with capacity to calculate 9.6 GFlops.
- Elbrus-4S (2014) working at 800 MHz, with capacity to calculate 50 GFlops.
- Elbrus-1S+ (2016) system on a chip (SoC) with graphics processing unit (GPU), working at 600–1000 MHz, with capacity to calculate 24 GFlops.
- Elbrus-8S (2014–2015) working at 1300 MHz, with capacity to calculate 250 GFlops.
- Elbrus-8SV (2018) working at 1500 MHz, with capacity to calculate 576 GFlops.
- Elbrus-16S (2019) working at 2000 MHz, with capacity to calculate 1.5 TFlops.

=== SPARC ===
- Elbrus-90micro (1998–2010) is a computer line based on SPARC instruction set architecture (ISA) microprocessors: MCST R80, R150, R500, R500S and MCST-4R working at 80, 150, 500, and 1000 MHz. The Elbrus-90 is used to control the S-400 missile system.

== See also ==
- List of Soviet computer systems
- List of Russian microprocessors
