= MCST =

Russian computer company

- Type: Joint-stock company
- Industry: Microprocessors
- Founded: 1992; 34 years ago
- Founder: Boris Babayan
- Headquarters: Moscow, Russia
- Revenue: $25 million (2017)
- Operating income: $1.34 million (2017)
- Net income: $911,252 (2017)
- Total assets: $54 million (2017)
- Total equity: $6.15 million (2017)
- Website: mcst.ru

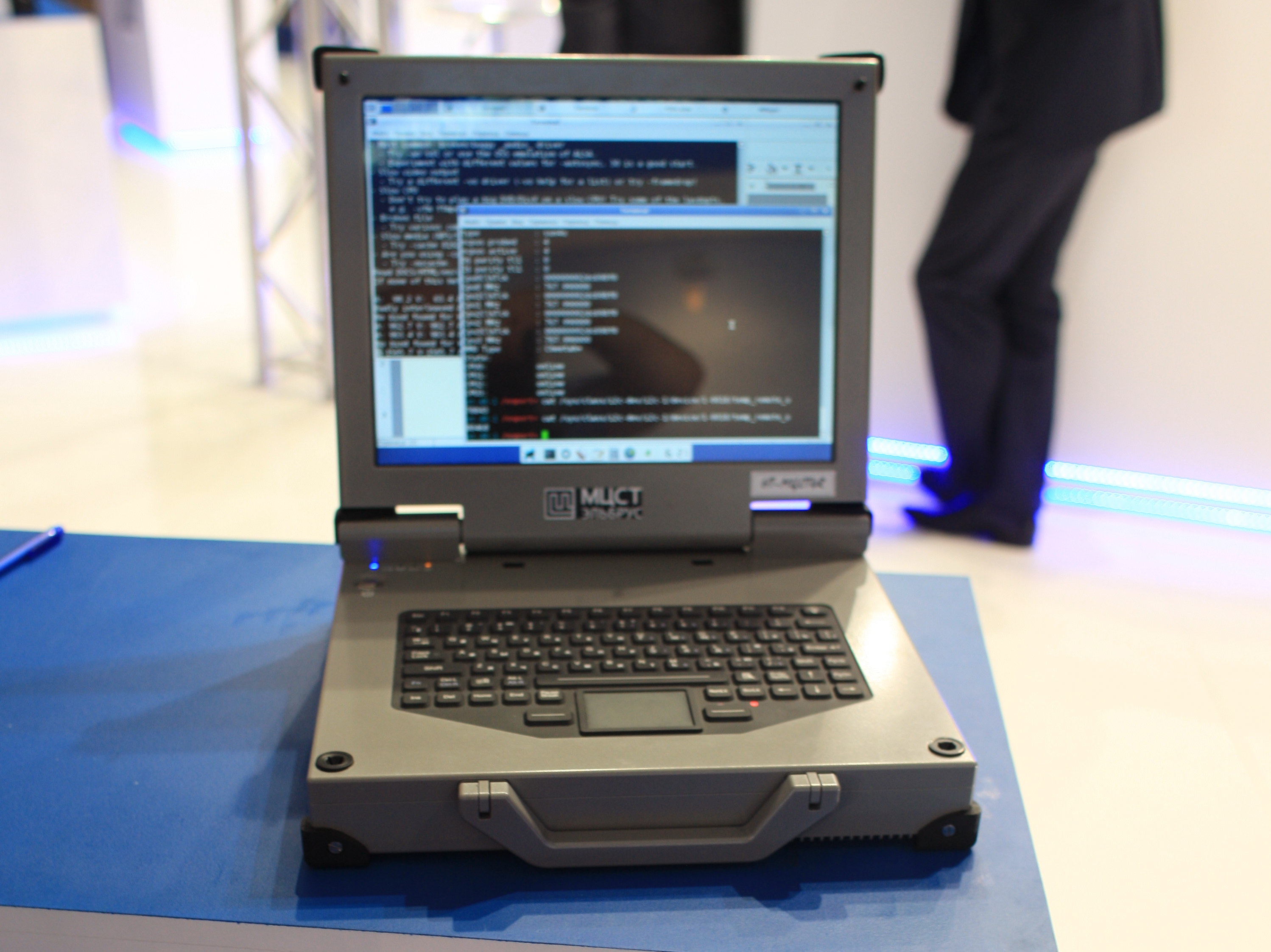
MCST Elbrus HT-R1000 laptop at 2013 MAKS Airshow

8-core microprocessor Elbrus-8SV

MCST (Russian: МЦСТ, acronym for Moscow Center of SPARC Technologies) is a Russian microprocessor company that was set up in 1992. Different types of processors made by MCST were used in personal computers, servers and computing systems. MCST develops microprocessors based on two different instruction set architecture (ISA): Elbrus and SPARC. MCST is a direct descendant of the Lebedev Institute of Precision Mechanics and Computer Engineering.

MCST is the base organization of the Department of Informatics and Computer Engineering of the Moscow Institute of Physics and Technology.

MCST develops the Elbrus processor architecture and the eponymous family of universal VLIW microprocessors based on it with the participation of INEUM. The name "Elbrus" has been given the backronym "ExpLicit Basic Resources Utilization Scheduling".

In June 2024, the "Elbrus-2S3" has resurfaced on the Russian market. This is a nine-core ("CPU-core×2" + "3D・GPU-core×1" + "2D・GPU-core×2" + "VPU-core×4") CPU manufactured with a 16nm process. This is the cut down version of the 16-core Elbrus-16S, which might also resurface at some point if there's enough market demand for this to make sense.

In December 2024, Programmable logic controllers "PLC-Elbrus (based on the Elbrus-2S3 microprocessor) " of the holding company "Rostec Electronics" of the State Corporation Rostec have passed state registration and are included in the register of software and hardware complexes of the Ministry of Digital Development of the Russian Federation. This allows using the devices at critical information infrastructure facilities to create automated process control systems.

== Products ==
- Elbrus 1 (1973) was the fourth generation Soviet computer, developed by Vsevolod Burtsev. Implements tag-based architecture and ALGOL as system language like the Burroughs large systems. A side development was an update of the 1965 BESM-6 as Elbrus-1K2.
- Elbrus 2 (1977) was a 10-processor computer, considered the first Soviet supercomputer, with superscalar RISC processors. Re-implementation of the Elbrus 1 architecture with faster ECL chips.
- Elbrus 3 (1986) was a 16-processor computer developed by Boris Babayan. Differing completely from the architecture of both Elbrus 1 and Elbrus 2, it employed a VLIW architecture.
- Elbrus-90micro (1998–2010) is a computer line based on SPARC instruction set architecture (ISA) microprocessors: MCST R80, R150, R500, R500S, MCST-4R (MCST-R1000) and MCST-R2000 working at 80, 150, 500, 1000 and 2000 MHz.
- Elbrus-3M1 (2005) is a two-processor computer based on the Elbrus 2000 microprocessor employing VLIW architecture working at 300 MHz. It is a further development of the Elbrus 3 (1986).
- Elbrus МВ3S1/C (2009) is a ccNUMA 4-processor computer based on Elbrus-S microprocessor working at 500 MHz.
- Elbrus-2S+ (2011) is a dual-core Elbrus 2000 based microprocessor working at 500 MHz, with capacity to calculate 16 GFlops.
- Elbrus-2SM (2014) is a dual-core Elbrus 2000 based microprocessor working at 300 MHz, with capacity to calculate 9.6 GFlops.
- Elbrus-4S (2014) is a quad-core Elbrus 2000 based microprocessor working at 800 MHz, with capacity to calculate 50 GFlops.
- Elbrus-8S (2014–2015) is an octa-core Elbrus 2000 based microprocessor working at 1300 MHz, with capacity to calculate 250 GFlops.
- Elbrus-8SV (2018) is an octa-core Elbrus 2000 based microprocessor working at 1500 MHz, with capacity to calculate 576 GFlops.
- Elbrus-16S (2021) is 16-core Elbrus 2000 based microprocessor working at 2000 MHz, with capacity to calculate 750 GFlops at double precision and 1.5 TFlops at single precision operations.
- Elbrus-32S (Sample production was planned in 2025) is a 32-core Elbrus 2000 based microprocessor working at 2500 MHz, with capacity to calculate 1.5 TFlops.

== See also ==
- History of computing in the Soviet Union
- Information technology in Russia
