= MCST-R2000 =

MCST R2000
General information
- Launched: 2018; 7 years ago
- Designed by: MCST
- Common manufacturer: TSMC

Performance
- Max. CPU clock rate: 2 GHz

Architecture and classification
- Instruction set: SPARC V9

Physical specifications
- Cores: 8

History
- Predecessor: MCST-R1000

The MCST R2000, (e90), (Russian: МЦСТ R2000) is a 64-bit microprocessor developed by Moscow Center of SPARC Technologies (MCST) and fabricated by TSMC.

== MCST R2000 Highlights ==
- implements the SPARC V9 instruction set architecture (ISA)
- octa-core
- core specifications:
  - out-of-order, dual-issue superscalar
    - two integer units
    - one floating-point unit
- integrated memory controller
- integrated ccNUMA controller
- 2 GHz clock rate
- 28 nm process
- ~500 million transistors
