= Boris Babayan =

Russian computer scientist

- Борис Бабаян
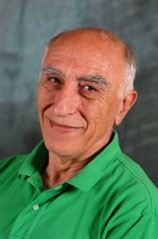
- Born: 20 December 1933 (age 92); Baku, Soviet Union
- Education: Moscow Institute of Physics and Technology
- Known for: Chief architect of Elbrus supercomputers
- Awards: Lenin Prize (1987); USSR State Prize (1974)
- Scientific career
- Fields: Computer science
- Workplaces: Moscow Center of SPARC Technologies (MCST)

Boris Artashesovich Babayan (Russian: Борис Арташеcович Бабаян; Armenian: Բորիս Արտաշեսի Բաբայան; born Baku, 20 December 1933) is a Soviet and Russian computer scientist of Armenian descent, notable as the pioneering creator of supercomputers in the former Soviet Union and Russia.

== Biography ==
Babayan was born in Baku, Soviet Union to an Armenian family. He graduated from the Moscow Institute of Physics and Technology in 1957. He completed his Ph.D. in 1964 and his doctorate of science in 1971.

From 1956 to 1996, Babayan worked in the Lebedev Institute of Precision Mechanics and Computer Engineering, where he eventually became chief of the hardware and software division. Babayan and his team built their first computers during the 1950s. In the 1970s, being one of 15 deputies of chief architect V. S. Burtsev, he worked on the first superscalar computer, the Elbrus-1 and programming language Эль-76. Using these computers in 1978, ten years before commercial applications appeared in the West, the Soviet Union developed its missile systems and its nuclear and space programs.

A team headed by Babayan designed Elbrus-3 computer using an architecture named Explicitly Parallel Instruction Computing (EPIC).

From 1992 to 2004, Babayan held senior positions in the Moscow Center for SPARC Technology (MCST) and Elbrus International. In these roles he led the development of Elbrus 2000 (single-chip implementation of Elbrus-3) and Elbrus90micro (SPARC computer based on domestically developed microprocessor) projects.

Since August 2004, Babayan is the Director of Architecture for the Software and Solutions Group in Intel Corporation and scientific advisor of the Intel R&D center in Moscow. He leads efforts in such areas as compilers, binary translation and security technologies. He became the second European holding the Intel Fellow title (after Norwegian, Tryggve Fossum).

Babayan was awarded the two highest honors in the former Soviet Union: the USSR State Prize for his achievements in 1974 in the field of computer-aided design, and the Lenin Prize in 1987 for the Elbrus-2 supercomputer design. Since 1984, he has been a corresponding member of the USSR Academy of Sciences (later - Russian Academy of Sciences). He served as a professor at the Moscow Institute of Physics and Technology and held the Microprocessor Technology chair in Moscow based R&D center of Intel Corporation before his retirement in February 2022.
