= BESM-6 =

Soviet computer model (1968–1985)

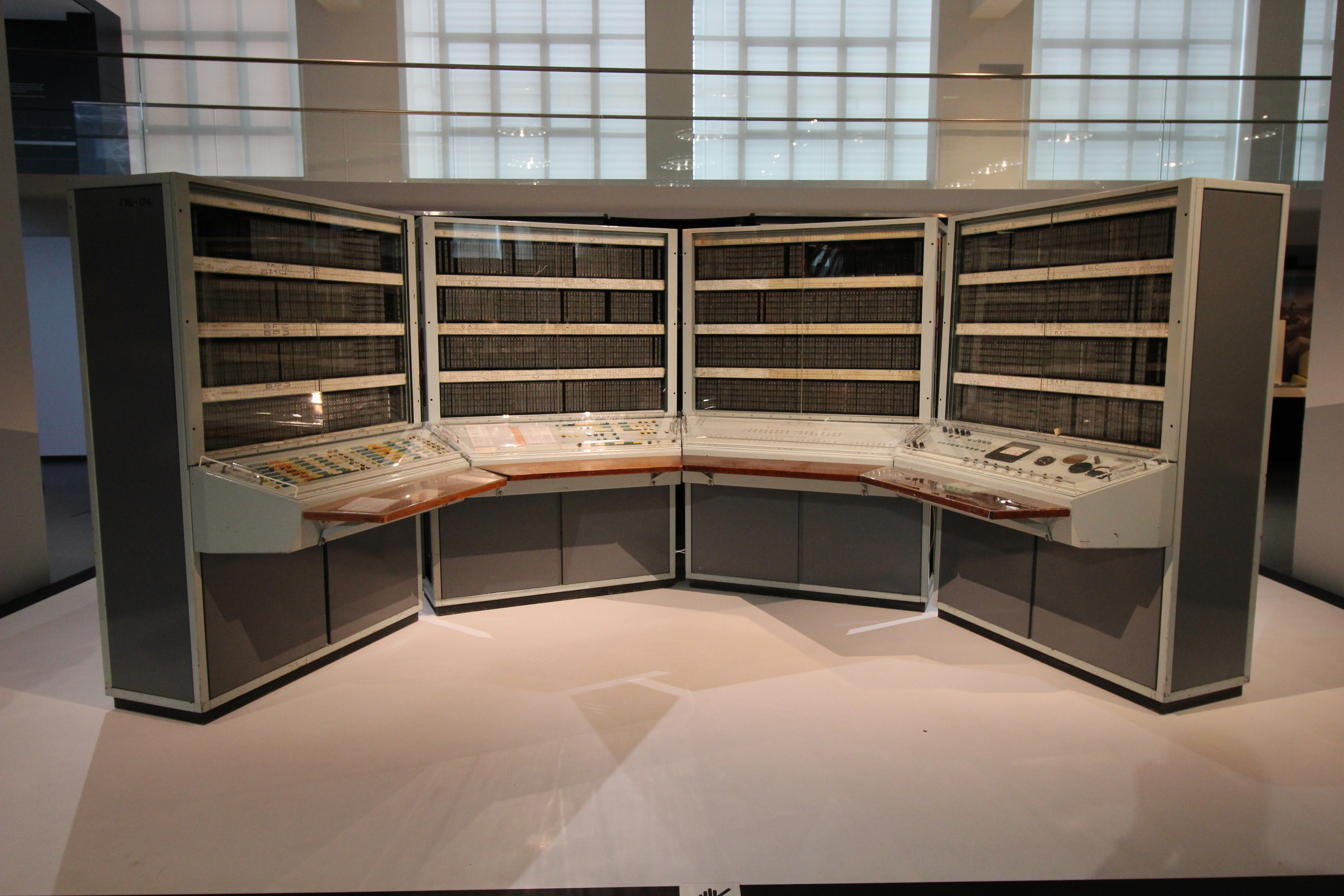
- BESM-6 at London Science Museum

Design
- Manufacturer: Moscow Plant of Calculating and Analysing Machines (SAM)
- Designer: S. A. Lebedev
- Release date: 1968; 58 years ago
- Units sold: 355
- Price: 530,000 Rbls

Casing
- Dimensions: Footprint : 150-200 m²
- Weight: -
- Power: 30 kW @ 220 V 50 Hz

System
- Operating system: D-68, Dispak, Dubna OS
- CPU: 48-bit processor @ 9 MHz
- Memory: Up to 192 kilobytes (32768 x 48 bits)
- MIPS: 1 MIPS
- FLOPS: 0.418 MFLOPS
- Predecessor: BESM-4
- Successor: Elbrus-1K2

BESM-6 (Russian: БЭСМ-6, short for Большая электронно-счётная машина, i.e. 'Large Electronic Calculating Machine') was a Soviet electronic computer of the BESM series.

== Overview ==
The BESM-6 was the most well-known and influential model of the series designed at the Institute of Precision Mechanics and Computer Engineering. The design was completed in 1965. Production started in 1968 and continued for the following 19 years.

Like its BESM-3 and BESM-4 predecessors, the original BESM-6 was transistor-based (however, the version used in the 1980s as a component of the Elbrus supercomputer was built with integrated circuits). The machine's 48-bit processor ran at 10 MHz clock speed and featured two instruction pipelines, separate for the control and arithmetic units, and a data cache of sixteen 48-bit words. The system achieved a performance of 1 MIPS. The CDC 6600, a common Western supercomputer when the BESM-6 was released, achieved about 2 MIPS.

The system memory was word-addressable using 15-bit addresses. The maximum addressable memory space was thus 32K words (192K bytes). A virtual memory system allowed to expand this up to 128K words (768K bytes).

The BESM-6 was widely used in USSR in the 1970s for various computation and control tasks. During the 1975 Apollo–Soyuz Test Project the processing of the space mission telemetry data was accomplished by a new computer complex which was based on a BESM-6. The Apollo-Soyuz mission's data processing by Soviet scientists finished half an hour earlier than their American colleagues from NASA.

A total of 355 of these machines were built. Production ended in 1987.

As the first Soviet computer with an installed base that was large for the time, the BESM-6 gathered a dedicated developer community. Over the years several operating systems and compilers for programming languages such as Fortran, ALGOL and Pascal were developed.

A modification of the BESM-6 based on integrated circuits, with 2-3 times higher performance than the original machine, was produced in the 1980s under the name Elbrus-1K2 as a component of the Elbrus supercomputer.

In 1992, one of the last surviving BESM-6 machines was purchased by the Science Museum in London, England.

== Peripherals ==
The BESM-6 could send output to an АЦПУ-128 (Алфавитно-Цифровое Печатающее Устройство) printer, and read input from punched cards in the GOST 10859 character set. A Consul-254 teletype, made by Zbrojovka Brno in Czechoslovakia, could be used for interactive sessions. When CRT terminals became available, the BESM-6 could be connected to Videoton 340 terminals.
