= T-Platforms =

- Type: Private
- Industry: Supercomputing, Information technology
- Founded: 2002
- Defunct: August 2023
- Fate: Declared bankruptcy
- Headquarters: Moscow, Russia
- Number of locations: Hanover, Germany; Hong Kong; Taipei, Taiwan
- Key people: Vsevolod Opanasenko (CEO)
- Products: Supercomputers, HPC solutions

T-Platforms was a Russian supercomputer company. Their main competitor was RSC Group.

Founded in 2002, T-Platforms Group was headquartered in Moscow, Russia with regional offices in Hanover, Germany, Hong Kong, China and Taipei, Taiwan. The company has implemented more than 300 integrated projects, six of which were included in the Top500 list of the world’s most powerful supercomputers. T-Platforms owns patents on a number of supercomputer technologies and electronic components. T-Platforms’ solutions are used for fundamental and applied research in various fields of science, including life sciences, physics, chemistry and mathematics, as well as for calculation-intensive tasks in engineering, computer graphics and many other disciplines. In 2011, HPCWire named Vsevolod Opanasenko, CEO of T-Platforms, one of 12 most famous and respected people of the global HPC community.

In November 2011, the 33,072 processor Lomonosov supercomputer in Moscow developed by T-Platforms ranked number 18 in the world, and the fastest in Russia. It placed 3rd in Europe. In October 2012, T-Platforms delivered its first supercomputer in the US to the State University of New York at Stony Brook (SBU).

T-Platforms is part of the plan of the Russian government to focus on larger supercomputers by 2020.

In April 2013, the United States Department of Commerce added T-Platforms to their "list of organizations and individuals acting contrary to the national security or foreign policy interests of the United States", preventing the company from buying computer chips produced anywhere in the world if the factories producing them use American technology. The decision was based on US concerns that T-Platforms work includes "the development of computer systems for military end-users, and the production of computers for nuclear research".

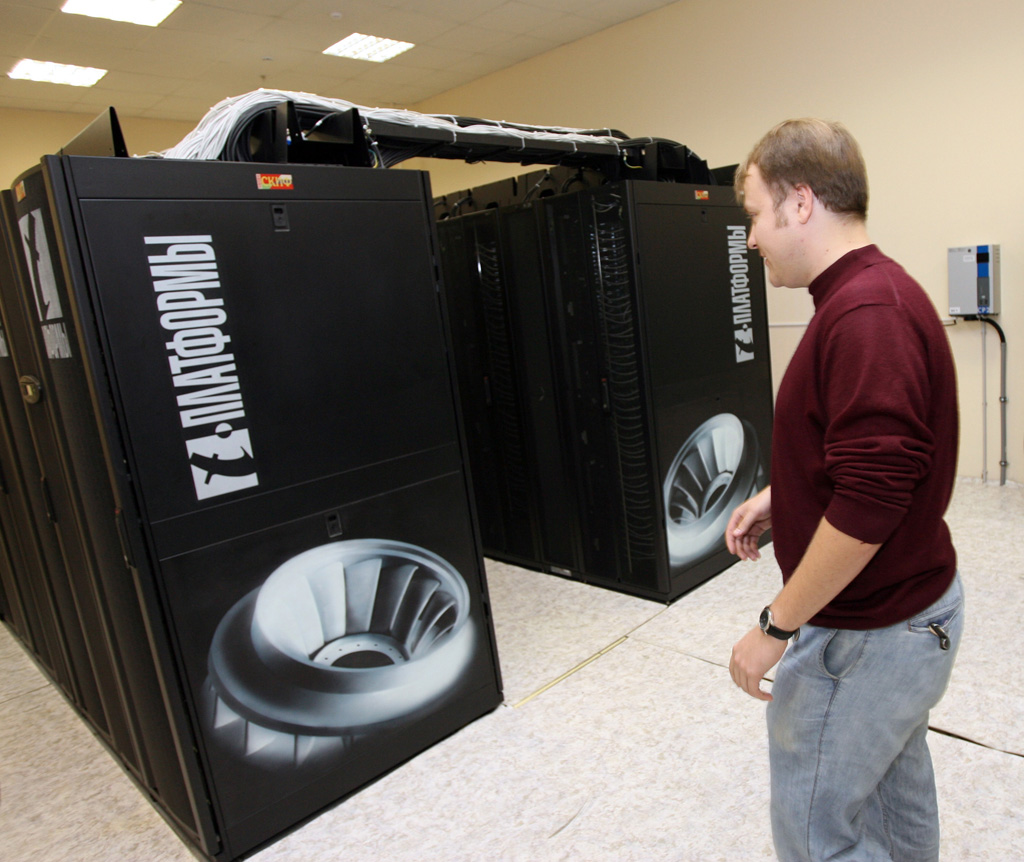
T.-Platforms Supercomputer at the Tomsk State University.

T-Platforms was delisted from the list in December 2013/January 2014, after removal request from the company. On March 31, 2022 the company was once again added to the US Government SDN list in an effort to limit the capacity of Russian Aerospace, Marine and Electronics sectors for the war against Ukraine. In August 2023, the company declared bankruptcy.

== See also ==
- Supercomputing in Europe
