= 130 nm process =

Semiconductor manufacturing processes

The 130 nm process is a level of semiconductor process technology that was reached in the 2000–2001 timeframe by such leading semiconductor companies as Intel, Texas Instruments, IBM, and TSMC.

The origin of the 130 nm value is historical, as it reflects a trend of 70% scaling every 2–3 years. The naming is formally determined by the International Technology Roadmap for Semiconductors (ITRS).

Some of the first CPUs manufactured with this process include Intel Tualatin family of Pentium III processors.

In 2020, American semiconductor company SkyWater Technology, in conjunction with Google and eFabless, released their 130 nm process design kit as open-source under the Apache License. This was the first ever open-source PDK.

== Processors using 130 nm manufacturing technology ==
- Motorola PowerPC 7447 and 7457 2002
- IBM Gekko (GameCube)
- IBM PowerPC G5 970 - October 2002 - June 2003
- Intel Pentium III Tualatin - 2001-06
- Intel Celeron Tualatin-256 - 2001-10-02
- Intel Pentium M Banias - 2003-03-12
- Intel Pentium 4 Northwood - 2002-01-07
- Intel Celeron Northwood-128 - 2002-09-18
- Intel Xeon Prestonia and Gallatin - 2002-02-25
- VIA C3 - 2001
- AMD Athlon XP Thoroughbred, Thorton, and Barton
- AMD Athlon MP Thoroughbred - 2002-08-27
- AMD Athlon XP-M Thoroughbred, Barton, and Dublin
- AMD Duron Applebred - 2003-08-21
- AMD K7 Sempron Thoroughbred-B, Thorton, and Barton - 2004-07-28
- AMD K8 Sempron Paris - 2004-07-28
- AMD Athlon 64 Clawhammer and Newcastle - 2003-09-23
- AMD Opteron Sledgehammer - 2003-06-30
- Elbrus 2000 1891ВМ4Я (1891VM4YA) - 2008-04-27
- MCST-R500S 1891BM3 - 2008-07-27
- Vortex 86SX

| Preceded by 180 nm | CMOS manufacturing processes | Succeeded by 90 nm |
