= Elbrus-2S+ =

Russian microprocessor

General information
- Launched: 2011; 15 years ago
- Designed by: MCST
- Common manufacturer: TSMC, Mikron

Performance
- Max. CPU clock rate: 300 MHz to 800 MHz

Physical specifications
- Cores: 6

Architecture and classification
- Instruction set: Elbrus 2000

Elbrus-2S+ (Russian: Эльбрус-2С+) is a multi-core microprocessor based on the Elbrus 2000 architecture developed by Moscow Center of SPARC Technologies (MCST). There are multiple reports regarding the evolution of this technology for the purpose of import substitution in Russia, which was raised by several ministries in July 2014, due to economic sanctions in response to 2014 pro-Russian unrest in Ukraine. In December 2014, it was announced that Mikron Group started pilot production of a dual-core variant of this microprocessor called Elbrus-2SM (Russian: Эльбрус-2СМ) using a 90 nanometer CMOS manufacturing process in Zelenograd, Russia.

== Technology ==
The Elbrus-4S CPU uses a VLIW instruction set where it can perform up to 23 instructions per clock cycle and is reported to have support for Intel x86 emulation through a virtual machine. When programs are built for Elbrus 2000 native mode, the compiler determines how the different operations shall be distributed over the 23 computing units before saving the final program. This means that no dynamic scheduling is needed during runtime, thus reducing the amount of work the CPU has to perform every time a program is executed. Because static scheduling only needs to be performed one time when the program is built, more advanced algorithms for finding the optimal distribution of work can be employed.

== Specifications ==
	Elbrus-2S+	Elbrus-2SМ	Elbrus-4S
Russian designation	1891ВМ7Я	1891ВМ9Я	1891ВМ8Я
Produced	2011	2014	2014
Process	CMOS 90 nm	CMOS 90 nm	CMOS 65 nm
Clock rate	500 MHz	300 MHz	800 MHz
Elbrus 2000 CPU cores Elcore-09 DSP cores	2 4	2 0	4 0
Peak performance (CPU + DSP): 64-bit; 64-bit; 32-bit; 32-bit; 16-bit	20 + 2 GIPS; 8 + 0 GFlops; 33 + 16 GIPS; 16 + 12 GFlops; 43 + 48 GIPS	12 GIPS; 4.8 GFlops; 19.8 GIPS; 9.6 GFlops	25 GFlops; 107 GIPS; 50 GFlops
L1 instruction cache (per core)	64 KB	64 KB	128 KB
L1 data cache (per core)	64 KB	64 KB	64 KB
L2 cache (per core)	1 MB	1 MB	8 MB
DSP cache (per DSP core)	128 KB		
Data transfer rate to cache	16 GB/s		
Data transfer rate to main memory	12.8 GB/s		38.4 GB/s
Communications: number of channels for interprocessor communications; channel bandwidth for interprocessor communications; number of input-output channels; channel bandwidth for input-output	3; 4 GB/s; 2; 2 GB/s		3; 12 GB/s; 1; 4 GB/s
Crystal area	289 sq. mm		380 sq. mm
Transistors	368 million	>300 million	986 million
Connection layers	9		9
Packing/pins	HFCBGA/1296		HFCBGA/1600
Package size	37.5×37.5×2.5 mm		42.5×42.5×3.2 mm
Voltage	1.0/1.8/2.5 V	1.2/1.8/ 2.5 V	1.1/1.5/2.5/3.3 V
Power consumption	~25 W		~45 W
Producer	TSMC Taiwan	Mikron Russia	Mikron Russia

== South Bridge ==
The south bridge for the Elbrus 2000 chipset, which connects peripherals and bus to the CPU is developed by MCST. It is also compatible with the MCST-R1000.

	KPI 1991VG1YA 1026A010
Produced	2010
Process	CMOS 0.13 μm
Clock rate	250 MHz
serial bus for communication with the microprocessor	1 GB/s – receiving, 1 GB/s – transmission
PCI Express controller, revision 1.0a	8 lines
PCI controller, version 2.3	32/64-bit at clock frequencies of 33/66 MHz
Ethernet controller, 1 GB/s	1 port
SATA 2.0 controller	4 ports
IDE controller, PATA-100	2 ports for 2 devices
USB 2.0 controller	2 ports
audio interface controller, AC-97	2-channel stereo
Serial controller, RS-232 and RS-485	2 ports
Parallel interface controller, IEEE-1284 with DMA support	1 port
Programmable universal input-output (GPIO) controller	16 signals
I²C interface	Channel 4
SPI Interface	Supports for 4 devices
Interrupt control subsystems	2 PIC + 1 IOAPIC
Timers	System timer and watchdog timer.
Crystal area	112 sq. mm
Transistors	30 million
Packing/pins	HFCBGA/1156
Package size	35×35×3.2 mm
Voltage	1.2/3.3 V
Power consumption	~6 W

== Applications ==
In December 2012, Kraftway announced that it will deliver an Elbrus based PC together with its partner MCST.

In August 2013, Kuyan, Gusev, Kozlov, Kaimuldenov and Kravtsunov from MCST has published an article based on their experience with building and deployment of Debian Linux for the Elbrus computer architecture. It was done using a hybrid compiler toolchain (cross and native), for Elbrus-2S+ and Intel Core 2 Duo.

In December 2014, an implementation of the OpenGL 3.3 standard was demonstrated by running the game Doom 3 BFG Edition on an Elbrus-4S, clocked at 720 MHz, using a Radeon graphics card with 2 gigabytes of video memory.

In April 2015, MCST announced two new products based on the Elbrus-4S CPU: One 19-inch rack server with four CPUs (16 cores) and one personal computer.

In December 2015, the first shipment of PCs based on VLIW CPU Elbrus-4s was made in Russia.

In June 2024, the “Elbrus-2S3 (Эльбрус-2С3) microprocessor” has resurfaced on the Russian market. This is a nona-core("CPU-core×2" + "3D・GPU-core×1" + "2D・GPU-core×2" + "VPU-core×4") CPU manufactured with a 16nm process. This is the cut down version of the 16-core Elbrus-16S, which might also resurface at some point if there's enough market demand for this to make sense.

In September 2024, The MCST company presented “Elbrus-2S3 (Эльбрус-2С3) microprocessor” at the 10th anniversary Russian forum "Microelectronics 2024".
