= Elbrus-8S =

Microprocessor/CPU

General information
- Launched: end of 2014 prototypes,
- Designed by: MCST

Performance
- Max. CPU clock rate: 1.3 GHz

Architecture and classification
- Instruction set: Elbrus 2000

Physical specifications
- Cores: 8

History
- Predecessor: Elbrus-4S
- Successor: Elbrus-16S

Elbrus-8SV

General information
- Launched: end of 2017 prototypes, 2018
- Designed by: MCST

Performance
- Max. CPU clock rate: 1.5 GHz

Architecture and classification
- Instruction set: Elbrus 2000

Physical specifications
- Cores: 8

History
- Predecessor: Elbrus-4S
- Successor: Elbrus-16S

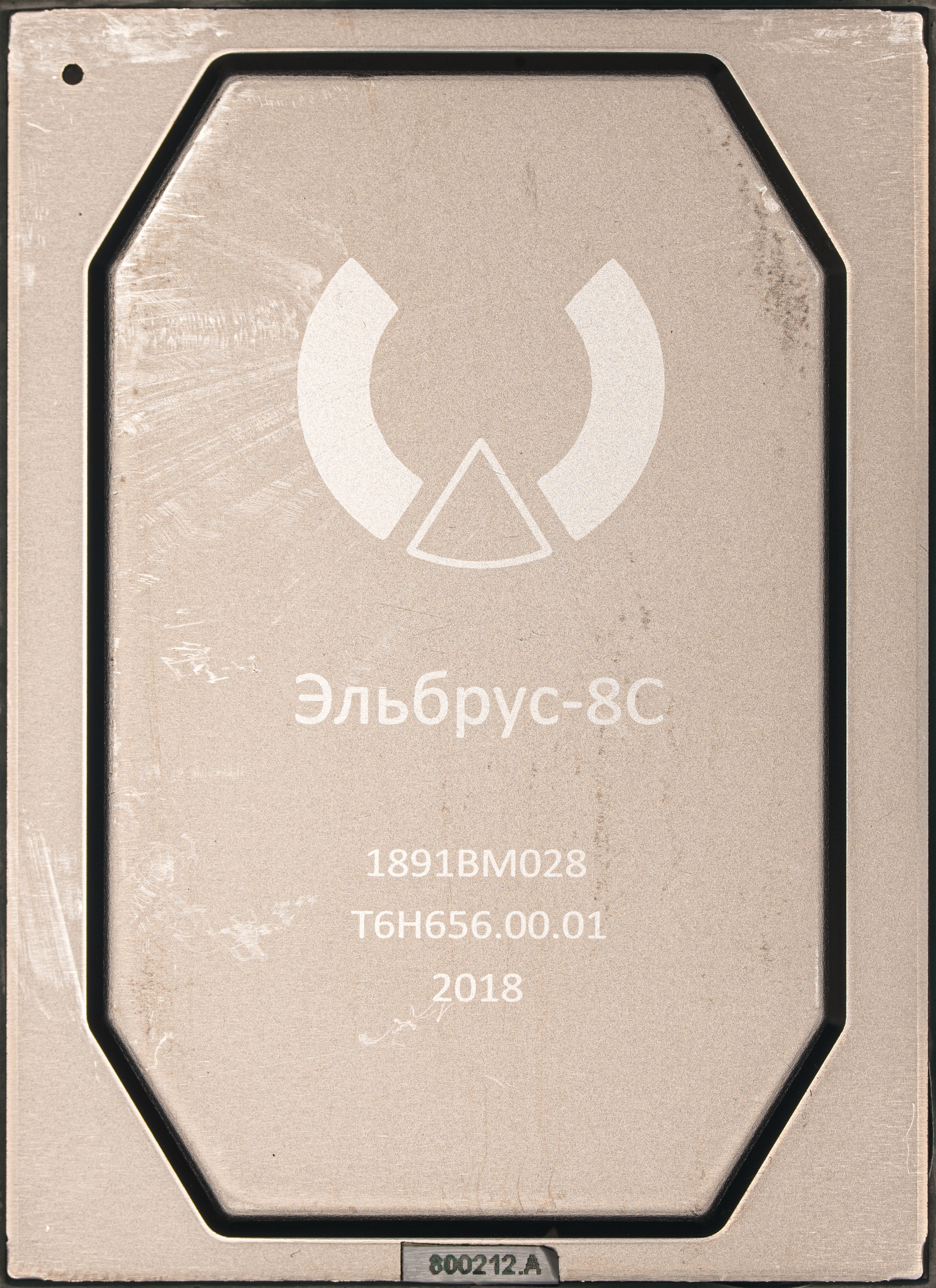
Elbrus-8S

The Elbrus-8S (Russian: Эльбрус-8С) is a Russian 28 nanometer 8-core microprocessor developed by Moscow Center of SPARC Technologies (MCST). The first prototypes were produced by the end of 2014 and serial production started in 2016. The Elbrus-8S is to be used in servers and workstations. The processor's architecture allows support of up to 32 processors on a single server motherboard.

In 2018 MCST announced plans to produce the Elbrus-8SV, an upgraded version of the 8C with doubled performance. The CPU can process 576 Gflops and has a frequency of 1.5 GHz, as well as DDR4 support instead of DDR3. Engineering samples were already completed in Q3 2017. Development was completed in 2019 and its fabrication started in 2020.

In 2021 the processor was offered to Sberbank, Russia's largest bank, for evaluation in light of a potential use for some of the company's hardware needs. The evaluation had a negative outcome, as the functional requirements were not met.

A 2023 benchmark demonstrated that the Elbrus-8SV performed moderately in gaming with games that were 10 years old but was incompatible with many modern games tested.

A successor, Elbrus-16C, was announced in 2020 with declared start of manufacturing in October 2021, but it has not entered the market as of 2023.

== Supported operating systems ==
The Elbrus-8S and -SV processors support binary compatibility with Intel x86 and x86-64 processors via runtime binary translation. The documentation suggests that the processors can run Windows XP and Windows 7. The processors can also run a Linux kernel based OS compiled for Elbrus.

== Elbrus Elbrus-8S information ==
Production start	2014 (samples), 2015 (for data-servers)
Cores	8
Computer architecture	VLIW, Elbrus (proprietary, closed) version 4, 64-bit
Tech. node	28 nm, TSMC process
Clock rate	1.3 GHz
Cache	L1 caches per core: 128 KB for instructions (1 port) + 64 KB for data (4 ports); L2 cache per core: 512 KB, 1 port; L3 cache, shared across cores: 16 MB, 4 banks 1 port each
Integrated memory controller	DDR3-1600, 4 72-bit channels (with ECC)
Peak performance per CPU, Gflops	125 for DP or 250 for SP
Supported programming platforms	C, C++, Java, Fortran 77, Fortran 90
Performance	250 Gflops

== Elbrus Elbrus-8SV information ==
Production start	2018 Q4
Cores	8
Computer architecture	VLIW, Elbrus (proprietary, closed) version 5, 64-bit
Tech. node	28 nm, TSMC process
Clock rate	1.5 GHz
Cache	L1 caches per core: 64KB data + 128KB instructions; L2 cache 512 KB in each core, 4 MB total; L3 cache, 16 MB per processor
Integrated memory controller	4 channel DDR4-2400 registered as ECC, to 68.3 GB/s 64 GB per processor, 1 TB address space
Peak performance per CPU, Gflops	288 for DP or 576 for SP
Operating conditions	−60...+85 °C, −40...+90 °C
Performance	576 Gflops
