= MCST-R500S =

MCST R500S
General information
- Launched: 2007; 18 years ago
- Designed by: Moscow Center of SPARC Technologies (MCST)
- Common manufacturer: TSMC

Performance
- Max. CPU clock rate: 500 MHz

Architecture and classification
- Instruction set: SPARC V8

Physical specifications
- Cores: 2

The MCST R500S (Russian: МЦСТ R500S) is a 32-bit system-on-a-chip, developed by Moscow Center of SPARC Technologies (MCST) and fabricated by TSMC.

== MCST R500S Highlights ==
- implements the SPARC V8 instruction set architecture (ISA)
- dual-core
- the two cores can work in redundancy to increase reliability of the system.
- core specifications:
  - in-order, single-issue
  - 5-stage integer pipeline
  - 7-stage floating-point pipeline
  - 16 KB L1 instruction cache
  - 32 KB L1 data cache
- shared 512KB L2 cache
- integrated controllers:
  - memory
  - PCI
  - RDMA (to connect with other MCST R500S)
  - MSI (Mbus and SBus)
  - EBus
  - PS/2
  - Ethernet 100
  - SCSI-2
  - RS-232
- 500 МHz clock rate
- 130 nm process
- die size 100 mm^{2}
- ~45 million transistors
- power consumption 5W
