= MCST-R1000 =

MCST R1000
- MCST R1000 FPGA prototype

General information
- Launched: 2010; 15 years ago
- Designed by: MCST
- Common manufacturer: TSMC

Performance
- Max. CPU clock rate: 750 MHz to 1 GHz
- FSB speeds: 2 Gbps

Cache
- L1 cache: 48 KB
- L2 cache: 2 MB

Architecture and classification
- Application: Embedded
- Technology node: 100 mm²
- Instruction set: SPARC V9

Physical specifications
- Cores: 4
- Package: FPGA

History
- Predecessor: MCST-R500S
- Successor: MCST-R2000

The MCST R1000 (Russian: МЦСТ R1000) is a 64-bit microprocessor developed by Moscow Center of SPARC Technologies (MCST) and fabricated by MCST.

During development this microprocessor was designated as MCST-4R.

== MCST R1000 Highlights ==
- implements the SPARC V9 instruction set architecture (ISA)
- quad-core
- core specifications:
  - in-order, dual-issue superscalar
  - 7-stage integer pipeline
  - 9-stage floating-point pipeline
  - VIS extensions 1 and 2
  - Multiply–accumulate unit
  - 16 KB L1 instruction cache (parity protection)
  - 32 KB L1 data cache (parity protection)
  - size 7.6 mm^{2}
- shared 2MB L2 cache (ECC protection)
- integrated memory controller
- integrated ccNUMA controller
- 1 GHz clock rate
- 90 nm process
- die size 128 mm^{2}
- ~150 million transistors
- power consumption 15W

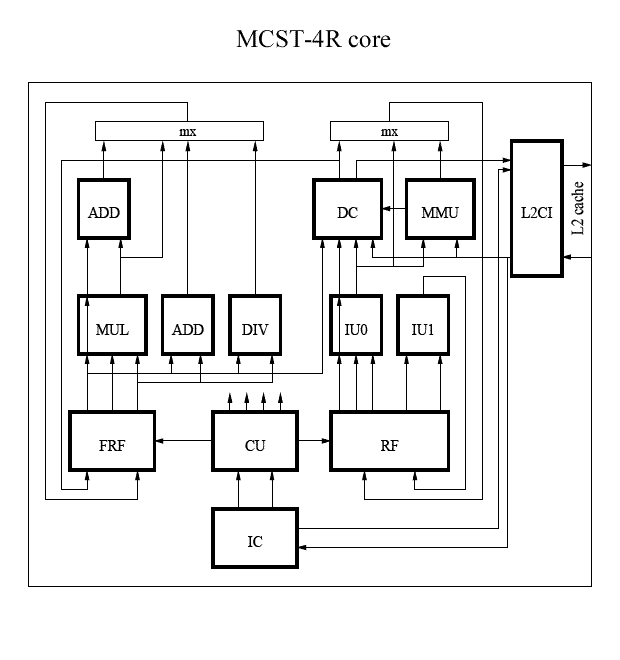
MCST R1000 core

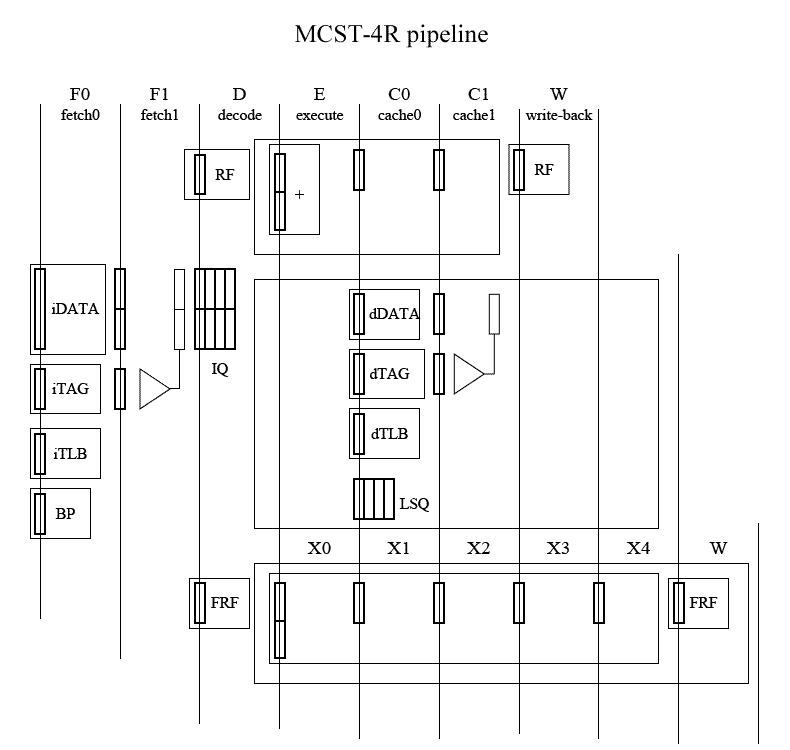
MCST R1000 pipeline

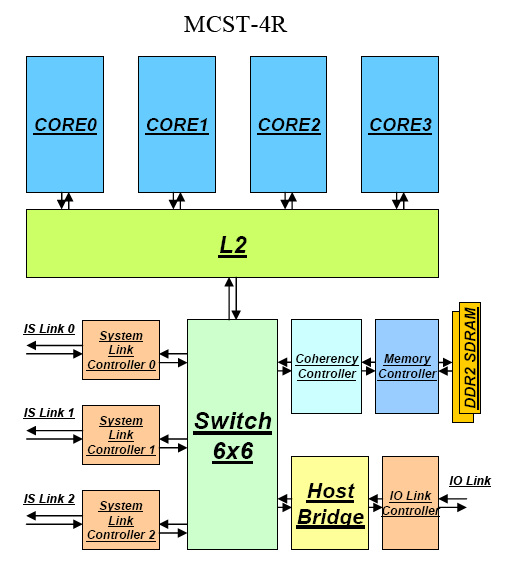
MCST R1000 diagram

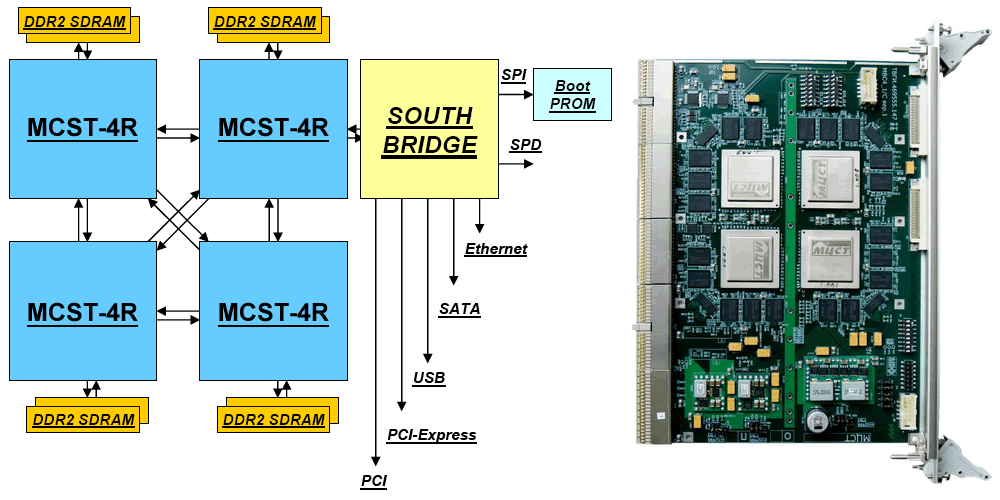
ccNUMA multiprocessor system with four MCST R1000 microprocessors
