= Elbrus 2000 =

Microprocessor designed by the Moscow Center of SPARC Technologies

General information
- Launched: 2007; 19 years ago
- Designed by: Moscow Center of SPARC Technologies (MCST)
- Common manufacturer: TSMC

Performance
- Max. CPU clock rate: 300 MHz

Physical specifications
- Cores: 1

Architecture and classification
- Instruction set: Elbrus

The Elbrus 2000 (or e2k; Russian: Эльбрус 2000) is a Russian 512-bit wide VLIW microprocessor developed by Moscow Center of SPARC Technologies (MCST) and fabricated by TSMC.

It supports two instruction set architectures (ISA): Elbrus VLIW and Intel x86 (a complete, system-level implementation with a software dynamic binary translation virtual machine, similar to Transmeta Crusoe).

Due to its unique architecture, the Elbrus 2000 can execute 20 instructions per clock, so even with its modest clock speed it can compete with much faster clocked superscalar microprocessors when running in native VLIW mode. For security reasons, the Elbrus 2000 architecture implements dynamic data type-checking during execution. In order to prevent unauthorized access, each pointer has additional type information that is verified when the associated data is accessed.

== Supported operating systems ==
- Natively, running directly on Elbrus ISA:
  - Linux
  - Sukhoi OS RV BagrOS-4000, an ARINC 653 and POSIX real-time OS. A replacement for foreign RTOS, as Integrity, PikeOS, QNX or VxWorks.
  - Embox
- Via binary translation of x86 or x86-64 ISA:
  - Linux
  - MS-DOS, Windows 95
  - Windows XP, Windows 2000, Windows 7
  - QNX

== Elbrus 2000 information ==
Produced	2005
Process	CMOS 0.13 μm
Clock rate	300 MHz
Peak performance	64 bit: 5.8 GIPS; 32 bit: 9.5 GIPS; 16 bit: 12.3 GIPS; 8 bit: 22.6 GIPS
Data format	integer: 32, 64; float: 32, 64, 80
Cache	64 KB L1 instruction cache; 64 KB L1 data cache; 256 KB L2 cache
Data transfer rate	to cache: 9.6 GB/s; to main memory: 4.8 GB/s
Transistors	75.8 million
Connection layers	8
Packing / pins	HFCBGA / 900
Chip size	31×31×2.5 mm
Voltage	1.05 / 3.3 V
Power consumption	6 W

== Comparative ==
Comparative table of technical characteristics Elbrus processors
Russian Designation	English Designation	e2k architecture	Cores	GHz	GFLOPS	NUMA	L2 (MB)	L3 (MB)	RAM	Graphics card	Int. Southbridge	Ext. Southbridge	Watts	Technical process(nm)	Year
Эльбрус	Elbrus	v1	1	0.300	2.4	No	¼	No	ext. counter	No	No	No	6	130	2007
Эльбрус-S	Elbrus-S	v2	1	0.500	4	4	2	No	3×DDR3-1600	No	No	KPI-1	13	90	2010
Эльбрус-2C+	Elbrus-2C+	v2	2	0.500	8	4	2	No	3×DDR3-1600	No	No	KPI-1	25	90	2012
Эльбрус-4С	Elbrus-4C	v3	4	0.800	25	4	8	No	3×DDR3-1600	No	No	KPI-1	45	65	2013
Эльбрус-1С+	Elbrus-1C+	v4	1	1.000	12	No	2	No	2×DDR3-1600	MGA2 + GC2500	No	KPI-2	10	40	2016
Эльбрус-8С	Elbrus-8S	v4	8	1.300	125	4	4	16	4×DDR3-1600	No	No	KPI-2	80	28	2016
Эльбрус-1СК	Elbrus-1SK	v4	1	1.000	12	No	2	No	1×DDR3-1600	MGA2 + GC2500	KPI-2	No	20	40	2018
Эльбрус-8С1	Elbrus-8S1	v4	8	1.300	125	4	4	16	4×DDR3-1600	No	No	KPI-2	80	28	2018
Эльбрус-8СВ	Elbrus-8SV	v5	8	1.500	288	4	4	16	4×DDR4-2400	No	No	KPI-2	90	28	2018
Эльбрус-2С3	Elbrus-2S3	v6	2	2.000	96	No	4	No	2×DDR4-2400	MGA2.5 + GX6650	EIOH	KPI-2	10	16	2021
Эльбрус-12C	Elbrus-12S	v6	12	2.000	576	2	12	24	2×DDR4-2666	No	EIOH	KPI-2	100	16	2021
Эльбрус-16C	Elbrus-16S	v6	16	2.000	768	4	16	32	8×DDR4-2666	No	EIOH	KPI-2	120	16	2021
Эльбрус-32C	Elbrus-32S	v7	32	2.500	1500	4	?	?	6×DDR5	No	?	?	?	7	TBA
Legend: Old model Current model Future model

Note: in the "Year" column the date of completion of the development work on the creation of the "microcircuit" is indicated. The appearance on the market of ready-made computing modules and machines takes at least 1 year, and multiprocessor systems and complex computing systems – at least 2 years.

== Successors ==
- Elbrus-2S+, produced 2011 by TSMC Taiwan
- Elbrus-2SM, pilot production 2014 by Mikron Russia
- Elbrus-4S, ready for serial production 2014
- Elbrus-8S, produced 2015 by TSMC Taiwan
