= Lebedev Institute of Precision Mechanics and Computer Engineering =

Soviet-Russian research institute

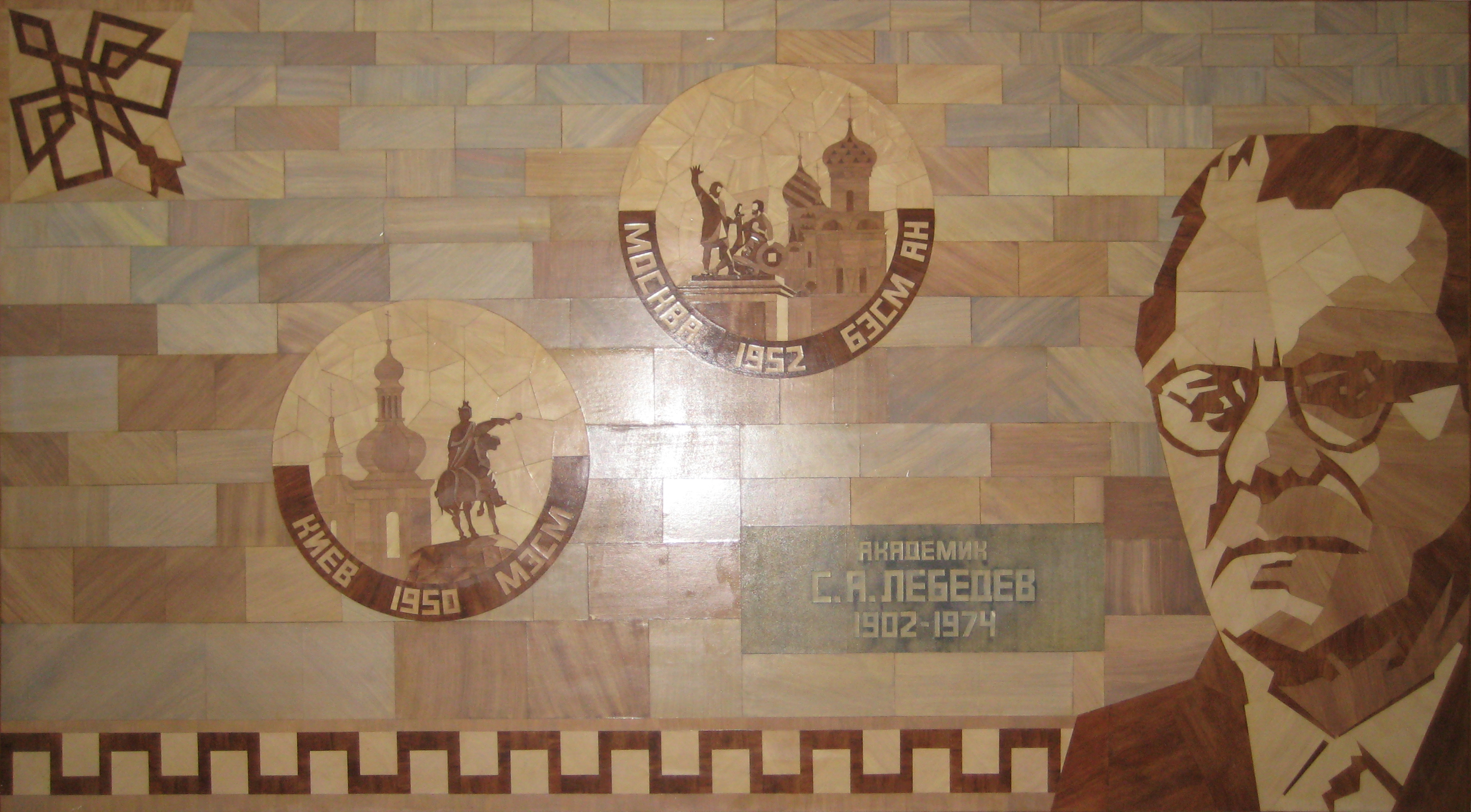
Fresco depicting Lebedev at the institute

Lebedev Institute of Precision Mechanics and Computer Engineering (IPMCE) is a Russian research institution. It used to be a Soviet Academy of Sciences organization in Soviet times. The institute specializes itself in the development of:

- Computer systems for national security
- Hardware and software for digital telecommunication
- Multimedia systems for control and training
- Positioning and navigational systems

In August 2009 IPMCE became a joint-stock company.

== Computers developed by IPMCE ==
- BESM-1
- BESM-2
- BESM-4
- BESM-6
- Elbrus-1
- Elbrus-2
- Elbrus-3

== Software developed by IPMCE ==
- Эль-76(in Belarusian)
