= Ukrainian strikes on Wildberries warehouses =

2026 drone strikes in Russia

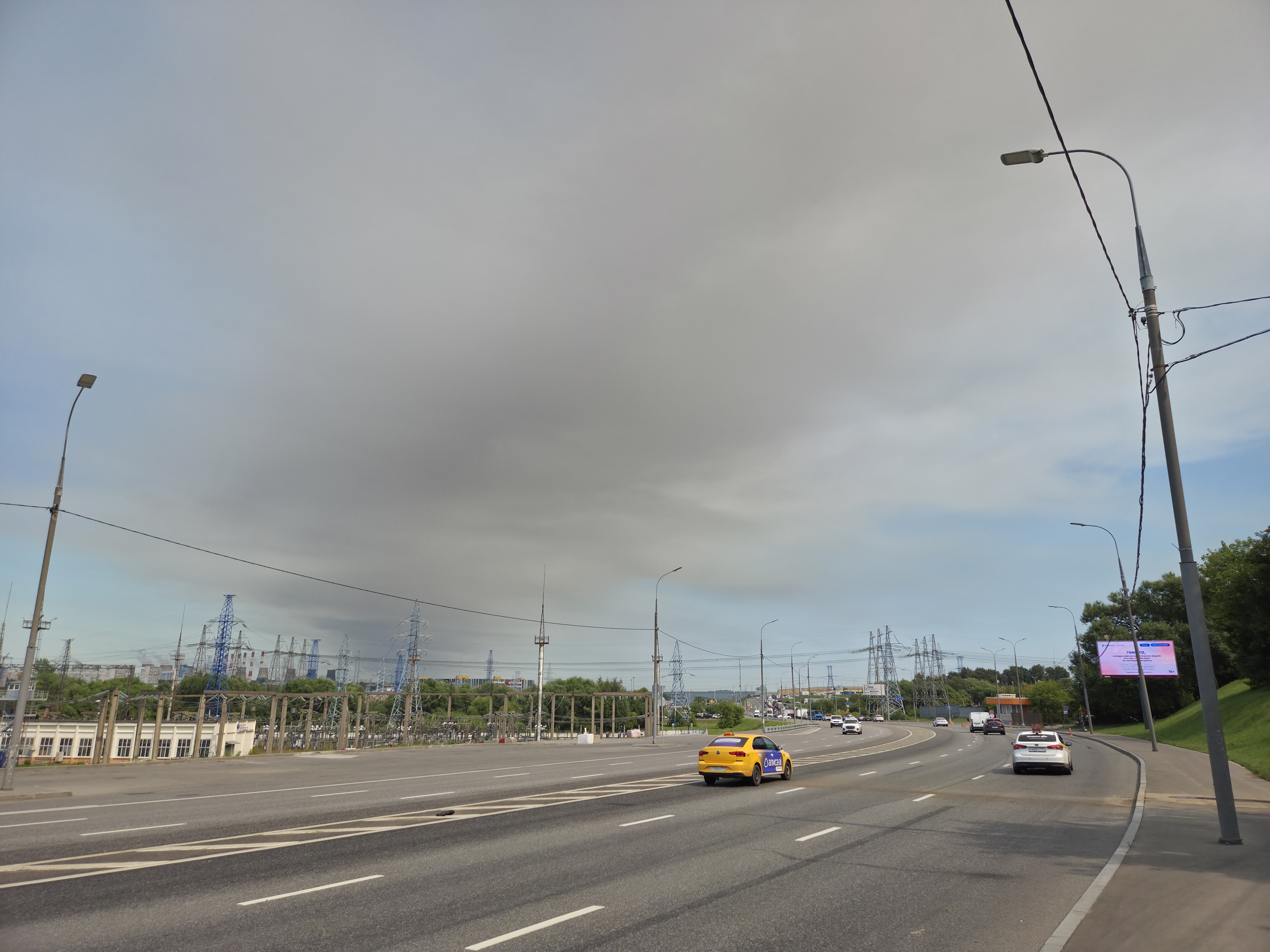
Smoke in Moscow Oblast from a fire after a Ukrainian attack on a large Wildberries warehouse on 18 July 2026.

Since 18 July 2026, during the Russo-Ukrainian war, Ukraine has conducted waves of drone strikes into Russia targeting warehouses belonging to Wildberries, a large online retailer in Russia which has aided the Russian war effort. Some other retail companies like Lenta were also struck, and on 22 August 2026, the first attack on an Ozon warehouse took place in Chapayevsk, Samara Oblast.

== Background ==
In 2026, Ukraine has been intensifying its attacks in Russia, most importantly its deep strike campaign, called "long-range sanctions" by Ukraine, which include strikes on oil refineries, causing an energy crisis in Russia. Such drone strikes have been considered one of the most successful ways that Ukraine has conducted asymmetric warfare against Russia, which has a much stronger conventional military on paper, but has proven to be incapable of adequately defending against drone-borne airstrikes on vulnerable strategic military targets on its own soil.

On 25 June 2026, President Zelenskyy had approved a 40-day influence operation of long-range, mid-range and SBU operations to push Russia toward ending the war, which UATV later reported had included the Wildberries strikes.

== Wildberries in wartime ==
=== Rapid expansion since 2022 ===
Wildberries logo since 2023

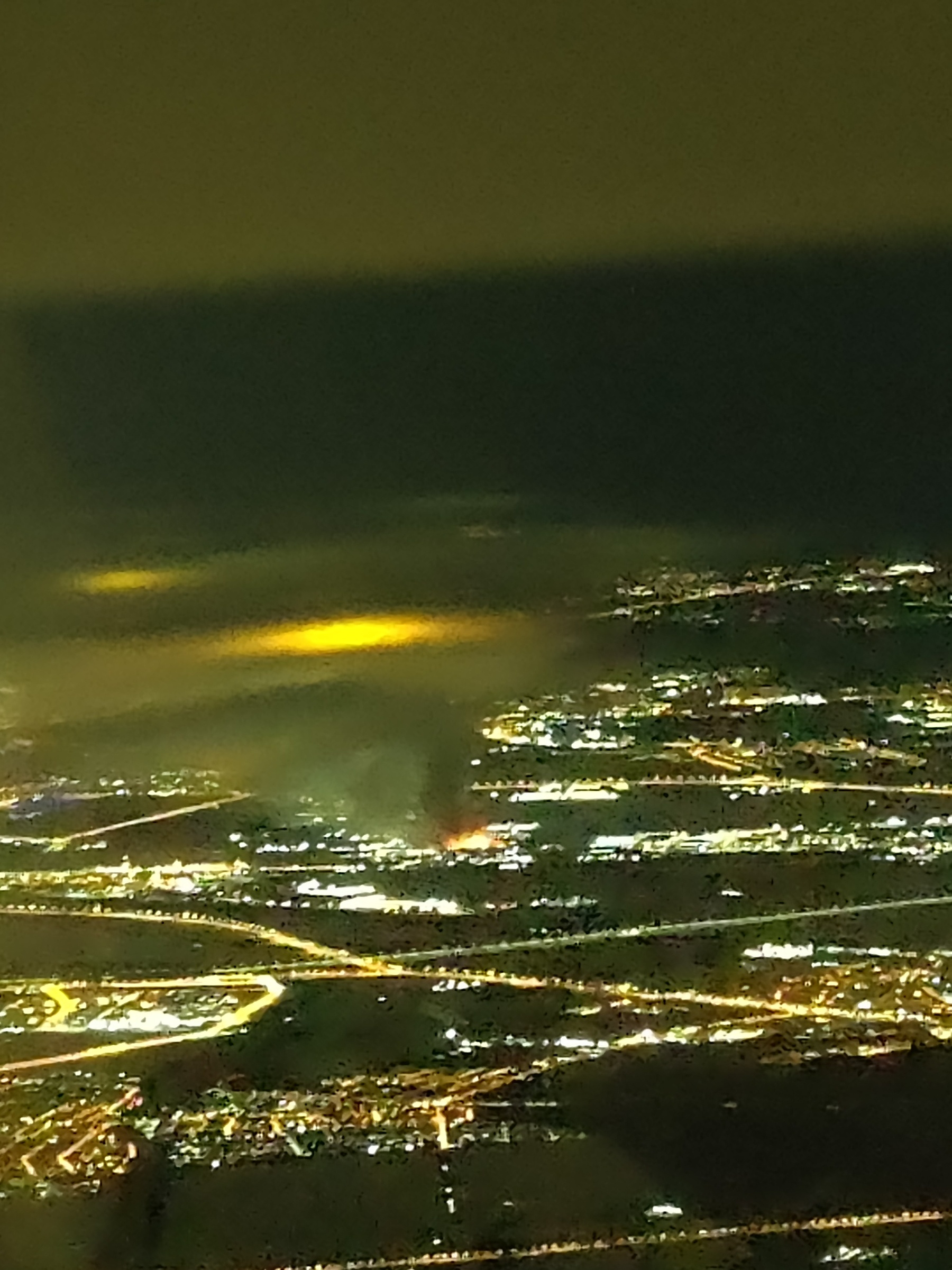
Major fire at the Saint Petersburg Wildberries warehouse in January 2024

Wildberries is the largest online retailer in Russia, and is widely considered to be the Russian equivalent to Amazon in the United States. Founded in 2004, the company grew rapidly since the start of Russia's February 2022 full-scale invasion of Ukraine, after which most Western brands quit the Russian market, and domestic companies such as Wildberries rushed to fill the gap. The chain's gross merchandise value almost tripled from 844 billion rubles (US$10.4 billion) in 2021 to 2.5 trillion rubles (US$30.8 billion) in 2023.

=== 2024 Kremlin-backed Russ Outdoor takeover ===
The frequency of state inspections by health and safety officers rose sharply in those years: 400 times in 2022, and over 1,600 times in 2023. After a major fire broke out at a Wildberries warehouse in Saint Petersburg in January 2024, the government opened a legal case against the company for allegedly violating fire precautions. Under circumstances that are not entirely clear, it appears that Wildberries was then forced to merge with the much smaller outdoor advertising business Russ one ninth of its size, with Russ' CEO Robert Mirzoyan also becoming CEO of the merged corporation, and Wildberries' CEO Tatyana Kim only keeping 65% of its stakes. Kim's estranged husband Vladislav Bakalchuk, head of Chechnya Ramzan Kadyrov, and some analysts described the rushed merger as a hostile takeover through krysha: Mirzoyan allegedly offered to protect Kim against criminal charges for the fire by using his close connections via billionaire senator Suleyman Kerimov to Vladimir Putin himself (who personally signed off on the deal) in return for acquiring a 35% stake in Wildberries, though Kim and Mirzoyan both denied these claims.

On 18 September 2024, a group of armed Chechen men of Kadyrov, led Vladislav Bakalchuk, tried to enter the company's headquarters in Moscow, leading to a shootout that left two Wildberries security guards from Ingushetia dead. Kim contacted the police, and Bakalchuk was briefly arrested on a murder charge, that was subsequently dropped, apparently with the help of Kadyrov's political influence. Analysts concluded that the shootout was Balachuk's failed last-ditch attempt to retain some control over the company through armed violence, and aligning Wildberries with Kadyrov's faction rather than allowing his estranged wife to place herself under the protection of the Kerimov/Mirzoyan faction. Kim subsequently divorced from Balachuk, and a few weeks later, Kadyrov declared a blood feud against Kerimov on local television, although no further conflicts between the factions have been reported since.

Following the 2024 merger with outdoor advertising group Russ, the combined Russ Wildberries group (RWB) reported a 2025 turnover of 6.1 trillion rubles (US$75 billion). However, Wildberries received no dividends over 2025; all of the 51 billion rubles (US$640 million) in dividends went to Russ Outdoor. As of 2026, Wildberries' share of the online retail market of Russia is 45% (well ahead of competitor Ozon at 32%), and is of particular importance when it comes to electronics and non-food retail. Wildberries and Ozon jointly represent about 4% of Russia's gross domestic income, with Wildberries having a client base of approximately two-thirds of the country's adult population.

=== "Everything for the Special Military Operation" ===
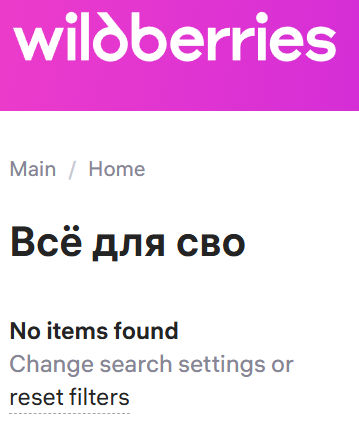
Screenshot of the Wildberries.ru website search results if the product tag 'Всё для сво' is clicked (18 August 2026). Until 26 July 2026, about 200,000 military and dual-use items could be found under this tag as products that any civilian or soldier could order at Wildberries.ru. After 26 July, they were still available, but under other tags.

The company has been accused by Ukraine of contributing to the Russian war effort, supplementing the Russian Armed Forces with components for aerial military equipment, which are used to target Ukrainian cities. On its official website, Wildberries publicly lists drone components, body armour, other military equipment and dual-use goods for sale. This includes drones, drone components, propellants, microcontrollers, video cameras, bullet-resistant vests, and battlefield medicine equipment. Before the Ukrainian strikes on the warehouses began, these items were all commonly found in the section "Всё для СВО", meaning "Everything for the SMO (Special Military Operation)", the official Kremlin name for its invasion of Ukraine. On 26 July 2026, this tag was quietly removed from products on Wildberries.ru, but "some products still carry labels such as ‘tested for the SMO’ or ‘used in the SMO zone’. According to The Moscow Times, more than 200,000 products were previously available under the ‘Everything for the SMO’ tag," Radio Svoboda reported.

=== Military economics ===
Because of Russia's full-scale invasion of Ukraine, Wildberries (in 2022 the largest taxpayer in Russia) and its founder and CEO Tatyana Kim (the richest woman in Russia) had previously already been subjected to international sanctions and trade restrictions. A possible additional reason for targeting Wildberries has been the fact that it provided the largest warehouse capacity in Russia close to the frontline in Ukraine, and the Russian military security services needed a lot of warehouse space to store and move large amounts of materiel, in which Wildberries was thus tasked to participate in.

On 7 July 2026, just 11 days before the strikes began, Wildberries updated its terms and conditions to state that the company could not be held liable for goods destroyed in "force majeure" events, which included drone strikes. This would later add to the fury of sellers, who lost all their merchandise as the depots went up in flames, and would not be compensated for it at all. Russian business media estimated that about 80% of the warehouse buildings and inventory were not insured by either Wildberries or the retail sellers.

Ukrainian president Volodymyr Zelenskyy said that the drone strikes were aimed at eliminating the Wildberries "logistics centers involved in supplying the Russian army with drone components, navigation equipment, and other military hardware," and were also a response to Russian attacks on Ukrainian cities.

Ukrainian officials say the primary goal of the operations is to disrupt Russian logistics and supplies which are much needed by the Russian forces, and that a secondary goal is to damage the Russian economy and support for the war amongst the populace. On 27 July, Fire Point co-founder and chief designer Denys Shtilerman added that Wildberries' partnership with the Russian state-controlled VTB Bank made it a prime strategic target; since Wildberries was the "largest borrower in Russia", its crash would result in several banks (including VTB) collapsing.

== Strikes ==
=== July 2026 ===
On 18 July 2026, Wildberries facilities were struck in Kotovsk, Tambov Oblast, and Elektrostal, Moscow Oblast. Online videos of the warehouses engulfed in flames surfaced. Eyewitnesses told journalists or independent media that evacuation of the struck warehouses was chaotic. The fire alarm was allegedly not raised until flames were already raging widely through one of the facilities. Some managers supposedly deliberately kept employees inside buildings rather than organising an evacuation, compelling workers to force open automatic doors manually. Some supervisors ordered workers to return their barcode scanners first before exiting the facility. One worker from a labour union hypothesised that evacuation may have been delayed over concerns that employees might try to steal goods. Experts told the Kommersant that restoring these two facilities could cost up to 35.8 billion rubles ($457 million; c. €405 million), which insurance companies would probably not fully cover.

On 20 July, a building rented by Wildberries as a sorting centre in the industrial park of Yuzhnye Vorota (Южные врата, "Southern Gate") in Domodedovo, Moscow Oblast was struck by drones, engulfing it in flames.

On 20 July, Wildberries facilities were reportedly struck in Koledino (south of Podolsk in Podolsky District), Moscow Oblast.

On 22 July, Wildberries facilities were struck in Krasnodar, Krasnodar Krai, and Nevinnomyssk, Stavropol Krai.

On 23 July, Wildberries facilities were struck in the Novousmansky District of Voronezh Oblast, located between the villages of Nechayevka and Alexandrovka. (Note: The warehouse is located at 51.614008625856°N 39.340819885282°E in Novousmansky District, between the three villages of Nechayevka, Alexandrovka and Novaya Usman. It's outside the municipal limits of all three villages, located next to a crossroads between the three places, although some media have reported it as located "in Nechayevka", "in Novaya Usman", or "in Alexandrovka".)

On 24 July, Wildberries facilities were struck in Novosaratovka (Utkina Zavod in Vsevolozhsky District) and Shushary (in Pushkinsky District), both nearby St. Petersburg and in Leningrad Oblast. A strike on a Wildberries logistics hub in Emmaus, Kalininsky District, Tver Oblast was reported the same day, although that claim turned out to be erroneous. (Note: There were some unconfirmed reports, later found to be erroneous, that the Wildberries warehouse in Tver was hit on 24 July 2026.) Wildberries also confirmed a drone-induced fire at its warehouse in Simferopol, the capital city of Russian-occupied Crimea. By that time, at least nine Wildberries warehouses had been hit on 4 days over the course of one week; the Moscow-based company Data Insight estimated the losses so far in merchandise alone at 170 billion roubles (c. $2.2 billion; c. £1.64 billion; c. €1.9 billion). As of 24 July, at least nine people reportedly died as a result of various strikes; seven of these deaths occurred at the Kotovsk facility on 18 July. Wildberries was estimated to have over 200 warehouses and logistics centres across the Russian Federation, which were practically impossible to protect completely from cheap Ukrainian drones with expensive Russian air defence systems.

On 25 July, a strike on a Wildberries warehouse in Yekaterinburg occurred in the morning. However, according to Wildberries, the warehouse itself was missed and operations resumed four hours later, with footage suggesting that only the parking lot was hit.

On 28 July, the 3PL logistics warehouse in Koledino, Podolsky District caught fire after an attack. The strike might have missed its intended target, as a larger Wildberries warehouse was located nearby, but reportedly undamaged and "operating normally"; 3PL ("Third Party Logistics") is an independent logistics company.

On 29 July, Wildberries facilities were struck in Tyushevo, Ryazan Oblast. Russian authorities reported shooting down 45 UAVs over the skies of Ryazan Oblast that night, while "falling debris" caused fires in industrial areas, injuring six people. After the facility was evacuated and firefighting was conducted, Wildberries' press service initially reported the fire had been contained, "most of the goods were saved, and the storage area was virtually untouched", but later said that the warehouse would temporarily stop accepting deliveries. On 6 August, Tatyana Kim personally visited Ryazan to meet with representatives of Ryazan retailers to inform them about the situation and develop support measures, suggesting that entrepreneurs seek compensation from local authorities.

On 30 July, two Wildberries warehouses were hit in Priovrazhnoye, Penza Oblast and Sarapul, Udmurtia, respectively. The same day, a Wildberries warehouse was struck in Zamulyanka, Perm Krai.

On 31 July, a Wildberries logistics and energy facility in Volgograd was hit by Ukrainian drones. The same day, Astra geolocated video footage of drone strikes on an industrial site in Zelenodolsk in Tatarstan, which houses facilities of both Wildberries and Ozon, to the Wildberries warehouse, adding: "Available footage shows smoke rising above the complex after the attack." While Ozon acknowledged that its facility in Zelenodolsk was temporarily evacuated during an air raid siren, but then resumed work and had not sustained any structural damage or employee injuries, Wildberries neither confirmed nor denied any drone strikes, merely saying that its Zelenodolsk facility was "operating normally". Reuters was able to verify one video of employees evacuating a blue-coloured Ozon complex, next to which smoke was rising, but concluded that "it was not clear on Friday [31 July] which of the warehouses Ukraine was targeting". It did note a cryptic message posted by USF Commander Robert "Magyar" Brovdi on Telegram that day, "the ozone concentration exceeds the critical norm," an apparent tongue-in-cheek reference to Ozon as the intended target, although the full quote revealed a mixture of Ozon and Wildberries references: "Ozone concentrations, against a backdrop of poor wild berry yields, exceed the critical threshold. The purple bush, pecked at by the Freedom-Loving Ukrainian Bird, is further poisoned by toxic ozone, turns into brushwood, changes colour and sheds its fruit." After a second, more damaging strike on 5 August, Wildberries announced that its Zelenodolsk warehouse stopped accepting new shipments and making deliveries, effectively ceasing operations. Meanwhile, no Ozon warehouse had yet sustained any damage as of 5 August, although it did suffer from some of the same indirect effects as Wildberries: evacuations, suspended operations, delayed deliveries, and somewhat frightened personnel. Already by 26 July 2026, Ozon and Yandex Market had updated their terms and conditions (effective from 8 August 2026) to abandon their obligation to compensate sellers if their goods were damaged or lost as a result of military action, including drone strikes, under the heading of force majeure, just as Wildberries had done on 11 July 2026.

=== August 2026 ===
On 2 August, a Wildberries warehouse was struck by the Ukrainian forces in Novosemeykino, Samara Oblast.
The next day, 3 August, one of the largest Wildberries warehouse in the country was hit in Khryastovo in the Sobinsky District of Vladimir Oblast. That same day, investigative news service Vyorstka estimated that the 14 Wildberries warehouses attacked so far covered over 1.5 million square metres of facility space taken out of operation, or about 27% of the Wildberries' total warehouse space.

On 4 August, video footage analysed by Astra showed smoke rising above an industrial zone in Krasny Bor, Tosnensky District, Leningrad Oblast containing a large Wildberries warehouse (154,000 m^{2}) and a smaller Lenta warehouse (70,000 m^{2}), although it was initially unclear which one was apparently hit. According to Meduza, the Wildberries warehouse was attacked, which the company said was evacuated in advance, and no one was injured; in addition, at least "one of the drones crashed" at the Lenta warehouse, injuring one employee. The oblast governor claimed 17 drones had been shot down, and confirmed that an open fire that had been raging at the Wildberries warehouse had been extinguished. Meanwhile, Lenta confirmed that a fire at its warehouse had been extinguished, and that a forklift driver had suffered burns and was hospitalised. The same day, a drone strike on an unidentified warehouse in Chekhov, Moscow Oblast was reportedly hit with a fire, five deaths and ten injuries as a result, although the warehouse's company was not specified by the authorities.

Various reports on 4 to 6 August, and again on 16 August, claimed attacks on the 77,000 m^{2} Wildberries warehouse in Emmaus, Kalininsky District of Tver Oblast; these strikes were partially confirmed, but the fires were quickly extinguished and only resulted in minor damage to its outer walls, and the warehouse resumed its operations each time.

On 5 August, Ukrainian drones hit another Wildberries warehouse in Aleksin, Tula Oblast.

On 10–11 August, the Wildberries warehouse in Novousmansky District of Voronezh Oblast was hit once again. On the night of 13 August, the Wildberries warehouse in the Chishminsky District of Bashkortostan was counted by the Radio Svoboda edition in Russian as the 21st hit by Ukrainian strikes since the attacks began on 18 July 2026.

On 15–16 August, multiple Wildberries warehouses in Moscow Oblast were attacked. Several resulted in large fires destroying building and stored merchandise including Russia's largest Wildberries logistics warehouse (at 250,000 m^{2}) at Koledino in the Podolsky District of southern Moscow, as well as the Severnoye (northern) Domodedovo multimodal logistics complex. Russian sources claimed that nearly 200 drones were intercepted. Satellite imagery from the next day revealed that the northern building of the Wildberries warehouse in Koledino had been thoroughly destroyed by the fire.

On 18 August, Ukrainian drones struck a Wildberries logistics centre near Atlant-Park in Obukhovo, Noginsky District, Moscow Oblast, according to Andrey Vorobyov, Governor of Moscow Oblast. In October 2025, Wildberries had reached an agreement with the owner of the logistics park to lease 110,000 square metres of space there. Wildberries confirmed the August 2026 attack, although it said only minor damage to the building's wall was done, and no goods were damaged.

On 22 August, the first attack on a warehouse of Ozon, the main competitor of Wildberries, took place in Chapayevsk, Samara Oblast. The strike resulted in injuries, and compelled the warehouse to suspend operations. The Ukrainian Ministry of Defence confirmed it had targeted Ozon deliberately: "Systematic strikes on storage centres for dual-use goods are making it more difficult for the enemy to operate and are negatively impacting the overall economy of Russia. After Ukrainian units targeted 15 of the largest logistics hubs belonging to Wildberries, it was Ozon's turn." The next day, a second Ozon warehouse was damaged by a drone strike in Orenburg, forcing it to evacuate over 300 employees, suspend all warehouse deliveries, and hide the goods stored there from its marketplace storefront. Also on 23 August, a warehouse of Logistera (Логистера) was hit in the Izhora industrial zone of Kolpino, a suburb of Saint Petersburg.

In the night of 23–24 August, three more Ozon warehouses in Southern Russia were apparently targeted: in Enem, Adygea (about 10 kilometres south of Krasnodar city); in Tyube, Dagestan; and in Nevinnomyssk, Stavropol Krai. Contrary to some reports, no Ozon warehouse was apparently hit in Krasnodar Krai, although the Russian Ministry of Defence claimed that three teenagers were killed following a Ukrainian drone strike in Krasnodar Krai, and Maria Lvova-Belova (Children's Rights Commissioner for the President of Russia) added six other children were hospitalised. According to local Russian officials, debris from Ukrainian drones shot down by Russian air defences crashed into a private children's centre. That incident more likely happened in connection to a drone strike on a Kuchenland Home warehouse on 24/8 Krugovaya Street in Krasnodar, as geolocated by Astra Press.

On 26 August, Kyiv struck the Wildberries warehouse in Kotovsk, Tambov Oblast once again. According to governor Yevgeny Pervyshov, 'the fire completely destroyed the Wildberries logistics centre.'

On 27 August, Ukrainian drones reportedly did minor damage to an Ozon warehouse near Ufa, which was temporarily closed for inspections. Based on footage gathered by Exilenova+, Militarnyi concluded the warehouse was located in Blagoveshchensk, Bashkortostan, some 40 kilometres north of Ufa, and that the warehouse was on fire, despite Ozon saying the damage was "minor" and customers should continue placing orders as usual. The same day, the Ozon Orenburg warehouse was evacuated, but (unlike on 22 August) reportedly not hit, and resumed operations shortly after the evacuation on 27 August.

In the early morning of 29 August 2026, early reports suggested that warehouses of Ozon and electronics retailer DNS in Rostov Oblast had been struck by Ukrainian drones. The Ozon warehouse was located right next to a DNS warehouse on 180 Novocherkasskoye Street in the northern half of Aksaysky District between Rostov-on-Don and Novocherkassk. While the fire at the Ozon warehouse was reportedly extinguished quickly, the DNS warehouse for digital and household appliances supposedly continued to burn for a long time. The Ozon warehouse did temporarily suspend operations to inspect the damage. In the afternoon of 29 August, based on Planet Labs satellite imagery of a damaged and smoking warehouse of over 200,000 m^{2} on 180A Novocherkasskoye Street, Building 1 (Строительство 1), Radio Svoboda in Russian and its reporter Mark Krutov reached a different conclusion: the warehouse at 180A that burnt out belonged to Офисмаг (OfisMag, "Office House"; confirmed by Yandex Maps), and was located between the apparently undamaged DNS Technopoint (180) and mostly undamaged Ozon warehouse (180B). There was a consensus amongst the reports that minor damage had also been inflicted to warehouses belonging to supermarket chain Chizhik and the Dorozhny logistics complex at the Logopark industrial zone between the villages of Dorozhny and Leninskoye in the southern half of Aksaysky District (22 km south of the OfisMag strike); a nearby Ozon warehouse again remained intact.

On 30 August, a Militarnyi OSINT analysis reported that Ukrainian missiles struck five different facilities in Belgorod: "the Belgorod CHP plant, the Estate Logistics warehouse used by Ozon, the PEK transport company, a facility in the city's industrial zone and a television tower." While air raid sirens sounded, air defence systems apparently failed to respond to the incoming missiles; the Estate warehouse leased by Ozon was seen burning, and Ozon reportedly suspended its delivery operations in the city. The next day, there was a near miss on a Wildberries warehouse in Yekaterinburg.

=== September 2026 ===
In the night of 10–11 September, Ukrainian drone strikes hit an Ozon warehouse in Saratov Oblast as well as again damaging the Saratov oil refinery run by Rosneft. The Kyiv Independent reported: "Satellite imagery published later in the day by Radio Free Europe/Radio Liberty (RFE/RL) showed the Ozon warehouse had been completely gutted by fire following the Ukrainian attack," adding that logistics centre covered 100,000 square metres.

Missiles and drones from Ukraine hit strategic targets in Taganrog on the night of 14 to 15 September, knocking out an Ozon warehouse, as well as the Beriev military aircraft repair and upgrade factory; there were no injuries.

=== List of strikes ===
There are two main types of Wildberries (WB) facilities, commonly called warehouses (склады, sklady), targeted by Ukrainian drone strikes:

- distribution centres (распределительные центры (РЦ), raspredelitel'nye tsentry (RTs), 'distribution centres (DCs)') for long-term regional storage; and
- logistics centres (сортировочныйе центры (СЦ), sortirovochnyye tsentry (STs), 'sorting centres (SCs)') for rapid sorting and local delivery.

Several non-Wildberries facilities have reportedly also been struck, presumably either deliberately (such as that of competitors Ozon and Lenta) or accidentally, due to being in the vicinity of a Wildberries warehouse.

⬤ Wildberries warehouse ⬤ Wildberries + other warehouse ⬤ Ozon warehouse ⬤ Other warehouse Timeline of events: 18 July 2026 — WB Elektrostal; 18 July 2026 — WB Kotovsk; 20 July 2026 — WB Koledino south; 20 July 2026 — WB Domodedovo south (Yuzhnye Vorota); 22 July 2026 — WB Krasnodar; 22 July 2026 — WB Nevinnomyssk, Stavropol Krai; 24 July 2026 — WB Shushary, Saint Petersburg; 24 July 2026 — WB Utkina Zavod, Saint Petersburg; 24 July 2026 — WB Simferopol, Crimea; 28 July 2026 — 3PL Logistics Koledino north; 29 July 2026 — WB Tyushevo, Ryazan Oblast; 30 July 2026 — WB Priovrazhnoye, Penza Oblast; 30 July 2026 — WB Zamulyanka, Perm Krai; 30 July 2026 — WB Sarapul, Udmurtia; 31 July 2026 — WB Volgograd; 2 August 2026 — WB Novosemeykino, Samara Oblast; 3 August 2026 — WB Sobinsky District, Vladimir Oblast; 4 August 2026 — WB Chekhov, Moscow Oblast; 4 August 2026 — WB Krasny Bor; 4 August 2026 — Lenta Krasny Bor; 4 August 2026 — WB Kalininsky District, Tver Oblast; 5 August 2026 — WB Aleksin; 5 August 2026 — WB Zelenodolsk, Tatarstan; 7 August 2026 — WB Yekaterinburg; 11 August 2026 — WB Novousmansky District; 13 August 2026 — WB Chishminsky District; 16 August 2026 — WB Koledino north; 16 August 2026 — Domodedovo north (Severnoye); 18 August 2026 — WB Obukhovo; 22 August 2026 — Ozon Chapayevsk; 23 August 2026 — Ozon Orenburg; 23 August 2026 – Logistera Kolpino; 24 August 2026 — Ozon Enem, Adygea; 24 August 2026 — Ozon Nevinnomyssk, Stavropol Krai; 24 August 2026 — Ozon Tyube, Dagestan; 24 August 2026 – Kuchenland Home, Krasnodar; 27 August 2026 – Ozon Blagoveshchensk, Bashkortostan; 29 August 2026 – OfisMag Aksay north; 29 August 2026 – Chizhik + Dorozhny Aksay south; 30 August 2026 – Ozon Belgorod (Estate); 11 September 2026 – Ozon Saratov; 15 September 2026 – Ozon Taganrog

Facility	Region	m^{2} (Note: Approximate area covered by the warehouse, distribution centre, or other facility in square metres (m^{2}).)	Ref	Strike dates	Ref	Damage assessment and status
WB Elektrostal	Moscow Oblast	230,000		18 July 2026		Destroyed. 1 death, 37 injuries.
WB Koledino north	Moscow Oblast	200,000	(Note: The north building is c. 200,000 m^{2}; the south building is c. 50,000 m^{2}; the combined storage capacity of the Wildberries facilities in Koledino is thus c. 250,000 m^{2}, the largest in Russia.)	16 August 2026		Destroyed.
OfisMag Aksay	Rostov Oblast	200,000		29 August 2026		Destroyed.
WB Aleksin	Tula Oblast	194,500		5 August 2026		Destroyed.
WB Chishminsky District	Bashkortostan	186,000		13 August 2026		Damaged, about 20% destroyed.
WB Tyushevo	Ryazan Oblast	173,000		29 July 2026		Damaged, deliveries suspended.
WB Sobinsky District	Vladimir Oblast	171,900		3 August 2026		Damaged, operations suspended.
WB Shushary, Saint Petersburg	Leningrad Oblast	170,000		24 July 2026		Damaged, operations suspended pending repairs (4 August).
WB Yekaterinburg	Sverdlovsk Oblast	158,000		25 July 2026; 7 August 2026; 31 August 2026	(Note: Video footage showed only the parking space adjacent to the Wildberries building in Yekaterinburg was hit.)	25 July: Minor damage to parking space. 7 August: Damaged, deliveries suspended. 31 August: Near miss.
WB Krasny Bor	Leningrad Oblast	154,000		4 August 2026		Damaged, deliveries suspended.
WB Novousmansky; District	Voronezh Oblast	152,900	(Note: Or 100,000.)	23 July 2026; 11 August 2026		23 July: Minor damage, resumed operations. (Note: Damage after the 23 July strike has reportedly been minor ("the main damage was caused to the Russian Post warehouse located across the road"); by 27 July, the facility had resumed operations.); 11 August: Major damage: 70,000 m^{2} destroyed (46%).; 1 death, 2 injuries.; Deliveries suspended.
WB Krasnodar	Krasnodar Krai	150,000		22 July 2026		Destroyed.
Ozon Chapayevsk	Samara Oblast	135,000		22 August 2026		Destroyed or heavily damaged; operations suspended indefinitely.
Ozon Tyube	Dagestan	130,000		24 August 2026		Damaged.
WB Zelenodolsk	Tatarstan	130,000		31 July 2026; 5 August 2026		Damaged, shut down.
WB Nevinnomyssk	Stavropol Krai	120,000		22 July 2026		Damaged.
WB Obukhovo	Moscow Oblast	110,000		18 August 2026		Minor damage, resumed operations.
Ozon Saratov	Saratov Oblast	100,000		11 September 2026		Destroyed.
WB Kotovsk	Tambov Oblast	100,000		18 July 2026; 26 August 2026		18 July: Damaged, partially operating. 26 August: Completely destroyed.
Ozon Nevinnomyssk	Stavropol Krai	93,500		24 August 2026		Damaged.
Ozon Blagoveshchensk	Bashkortostan	93,000		27 August 2026		Minor damage, temporarily closed.
Ozon Enem	Adygea	91,200		24 August 2026		Damaged.
WB Priovrazhnoye	Penza Oblast	90,000		30 July 2026		Damaged, deliveries suspended. 1 injury.
WB Novosemeykino	Samara Oblast	85,000		2 August 2026		Destroyed.
Logistera Kolpino	Leningrad Oblast	82,000		23 August 2026		Damaged.
WB Emmaus, Kalininsky District (Note: This Wildberries warehouse opened in the Emmaus(s) Special Economic Zone on 30 April 2026, with an initial storage capacity of 77,000 m^{2}.)	Tver Oblast	77,000	(Note: The original building is 77,000 m^{2}, while a planned expansion (currently under construction) is to add a further 73,000 m^{2}, so that the total storage capacity will be 150,000 m^{2} upon completion.)	4 August 2026; 6 August 2026; 14 August 2026		24 July: not hit; erroneous claim. 4~6 August: Minor damage. 14 August: Minor damage.
WB Sarapul	Udmurtia	75,000		30 July 2026		Destroyed.
Lenta Krasny Bor	Leningrad Oblast	70,000		4 August 2026		Damaged, 1 injury; (Note: The nearby smaller Lenta warehouse (m^{2}) was hit as well, resulting in a fire and the hospitalisation of at least one Lenta employee.) operations suspended.
WB Koledino south	Moscow Oblast	53,500		20 July 2026		Minor damage, resumed operations.
WB Zamulyanka	Perm Krai	50,000		30 July 2026		Damaged.
WB Volgograd	Volgograd Oblast	44,000		31 July 2026		Destroyed.
Ozon Orenburg	Orenburg Oblast	40,000		23 August 2026		Damaged, deliveries suspended. Resumed operations by 27 August.
WB Domodedovo south Yuzhnye Vorota (Note: Yuzhnye Vorota literally means "Southern Gate". This warehouse complex has also been identified as "Belye Stolby", after the nearby village.)	Moscow Oblast	25,000		20 July 2026		Damaged.
Domodedovo north Severnoye Domodedovo	Moscow Oblast	?		16 August 2026		Damaged.
Ozon Belgorod; Estate Logistics	Belgorod Oblast	18,250	(Note: Dzerkalo Tyzhnia reported about the size of the warehouse of Estate Logistics (Естейт Логістік), leased by Ozon: "According to various estimates, the site covers an area of between 12,000 and 24,500 square metres.")	30 August 2026		Damaged, fire, deliveries suspended.
WB Utkina Zavod, (Note: Also known as "Novosaratovka", after the nearby village.); Saint Petersburg	Leningrad Oblast	18,000		24 July 2026		Damaged, resumed operations. "Operating normally" as of 4 August.
Kuchenland Home; Krasnodar	Krasnodar Krai	9,000		24 August 2026		Damaged. Drone shootdown by Russian air defences killed 3, injured 8.
WB Simferopol	Crimea, Russian- occupied Ukraine	6,000		24 July 2026		Destroyed.
WB Chekhov	Moscow Oblast	?	(Note: The Chekhov Warehouse Complex (Складской Комплекс Чехов) is owned by real estate business Cian, which has been renting it to multiple companies. The buildings hit were reportedly rent by Wildberries, electronics retailer M.video, and others. According to Astra Press, Building 3 was hit, which housed Wildberries and various other companies. Building 3 has a total storage space of 68,460 m^{2}, but it is unclear how much of that was rented by Wildberries at the time of the strike.)	4 August 2026		Damaged; 5 deaths, 6 injuries.
Chizhik + Dorozhny; Aksay south	Rostov Oblast	?		29 August 2026		Minor damage to both warehouses.
Ozon Taganrog	Rostov Oblast	?		15 September 2026		Damaged.
3PL Koledino north	Moscow Oblast	800		28 July 2026		Destroyed (presumably by accident). (Note: The 28 July strike missed the northern Kaledino Wildberries warehouses, instead damaging a smaller nearby building (800 m^{2}) of independent company 3PL Logistics, presumably by accident.)

== Reactions ==
=== Wildberries and civilians ===
==== Losses and compensation issues ====
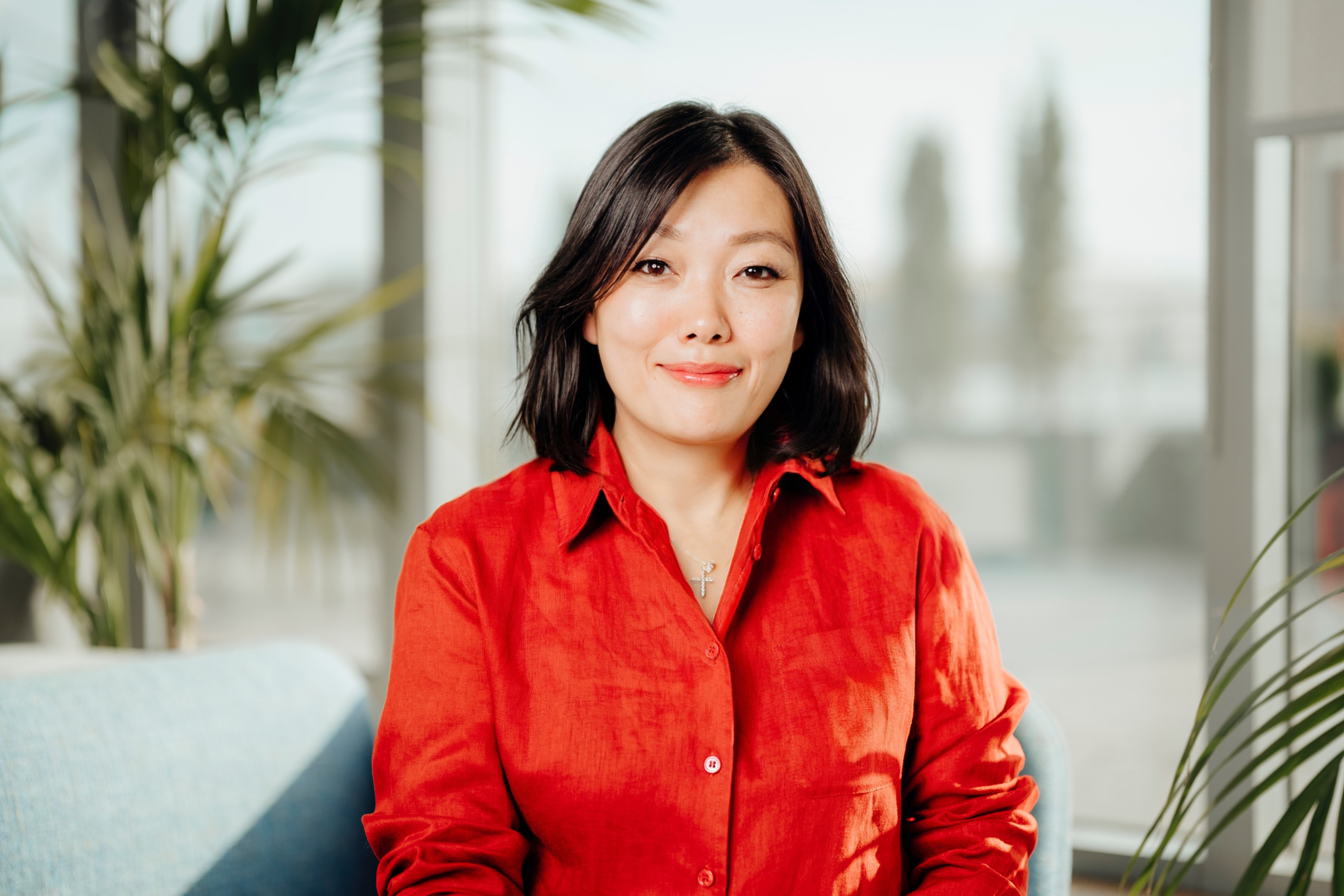
Tatyana Kim (2025)

Russians posted dozens of videos on social media with footage of the strikes and the aftermath, and their reactions to them. Some people living close by filmed burning warehouses with columns of thick smoke rising from them. Entrepreneurs who use Wildberries to sell goods broke down in tears while filming themselves, explaining that the fire at Wildberries depots had destroyed their merchandise, businesses, and sometimes even their last sources of income. By the end of July 2026, at least nine people were killed and dozens of people were injured as a result of the attacks, primarily Wildberries employees; the company had paid the victims or their loved ones about 0.5 million euros in damages. However, entrepreneurs who suffered material losses were unlikely to receive financial compensation, as Wildberries did not have enough cashflow to pay for it, and because of the terms and conditions that were updated on 11 July 2026, just a few days prior to the first attacks, in which damages from drone strikes were excluded from the list of scenarios for which Wildberries could be held liable.

At the end of July 2026, Wildberries CEO Tatyana Kim made the following statement in a video recording:

Terrorist attacks on our warehouses are force majeure circumstances. Whether or not this clause is included in the offer is irrelevant, and therefore these losses are not subject to compensation by law. Unfortunately, the internet has become rife with scammers and lawyers who seek to profit from our common misfortunes, exploiting the situation and people's ignorance to offer their services to solve problems. That's why I'm reaching out to all our sellers. Dear partners, trust only the official communication channels of our company and the government. In the current situation, only we and the government can help you.

— Tatyana Kim, Wildberries CEO

In early August, satellite imagery analysed by Reuters 'found that at least 1.18 million square metres of Wildberries warehouse space, equivalent to one-fifth of the company's storage capacity has either been damaged or destroyed.'

Every morning it's terrifying to open the news. People are losing everything. There are probably many people who were injured in the warehouse fires as well. It's horrifying.

— Russian small business owner,
working with Wildberries (early August 2026)

According to investigative journalistic platform Vyorstka on 7 August, Wildberries sales of six selected categories of military products – ‘Body armour’, “Copters”, ‘Quadcopter accessories’, ‘Weapon accessories’, ‘Night-vision devices’ and ‘Hunting scopes’ – dropped between 20% and 40% between 18 and 31 July 2026. Before the Ukrainian strikes on the warehouses began, these items were all commonly found in the section "Всё для СВО" ("Everything for the Special military operation"). After the initial strikes, this section was quietly eliminated, but all the products in it continued to be sold under different categories. Despite the reduction in sales, these six categories combined still represented at least 31,500 military and dual-use products, of which worth more than 1.5 billion rubles were sold in the months of May, June and July 2026 alone. The "Body Armour" category alone represented about 3,000 products (with labels such as "military" and "tactical"), for which sales totalled 472 million rubles in the same three-month period, although the number of orders decreased by 24% after the strikes began. Sales in the "Quadcopter accessories" category, totalling 118 million rubles in May–July 2026, fell by 36%.

On 12 August, Kommersant reported that advertisement tracking company Digital Budget said spending on direct banner advertisements on Wildberries fell by 63% from June to July, whilst the average advertising prices decreased by up to 15% as product availability declined. The same day, the Association of Suppliers of Goods for E-Commerce Platforms based in Russia stated that over than 400,000 sellers had been affected by the strikes on the warehouses of Wildberries (with some using up to 95% of their inventory), estimating the total losses at c. 600~700 billion Russian rubles (c. 6~7 billion US dollars, or c. 5.6 billion euros), including lost revenue. Costs for rebuilding or repairing all destroyed and damaged Wildberries structuries were estimated between 147 and 223 billion rubles (c. 1.7~2.6 billion US dollars, or c. 1.47~2.25 billion euros).

On 17 August, Vyorstka published a study concluding that Wildberries had lost about 2,395,000 square metres (43%) of all its warehouse space (c. 5.6 million m^{2}) in one month of Ukrainian drone strikes. 19 of the 22 Wildberries warehouses hit had been "largely or completely destroyed".

==== Solvency issues ====
Ukrainian military expert Ivan Stupak said on 1 August 2026: "If no one prevents us from attacking Wildberries at this rate, it will go bankrupt before the end of the year." He estimated that the Wildberries strikes had about 40% military importance for targeting materiel stored there that is needed at the front, and about 60% political importance to increase domestic pressure on Russia's president Vladimir Putin, via Russian politicians, their business associates and the general public being affected by material losses. On the other hand, it might prove difficult to demonstrate under international law that the presence of military equipment in these warehouses, and their use by the Russian military for use against Ukraine, was sufficient to justify what would otherwise be considered non-military targets, risking and causing civilian casualties in the process. Moreover, there was a risk that the overall response of the civilian population would not be to put Putin under pressure to end the war, but support him in escalating his military aggression against Ukraine. There is anecdotal evidence for both attitudes towards the Kremlin amongst the Russian population in response to Ukraine's Wildberries strikes: while some Russians focus on punishing Ukraine as the culprit, others demand the Russian state to compensate them for their financial losses if Wildberries does not pay up.

WB Bank logo

VTB Bank logo

In June 2026, a month before the first strike, Russia's second-largest state-owned bank VTB Bank acquired a stake of 5% in Wildberries' WB Bank, with an option to buy more shares later. By late July 2026, the possibility and willingness of VTB Bank to lend support to Wildberries was questioned, leading VTB shares to fall 2.5% on 25 July. Although Wildberries' reported debt at 830 billion roubles ($10.58 billion) according to Russian accounting standards is relatively low compared to other megacorporations in the country, it could still fall apart if VTB would prove unable or unwilling to bail the warehouse chain out. On the other hand, if VTB does decide to try and help Wildberries out, these additional debts would add to the financial troubles that VTB Bank was already facing (as reported by Bloomberg News in August 2025) long before the Wildberries strikes began, potentially dragging other troubled Russian banks down with it. On 27 July, Fire Point co-founder and chief designer Denys Shtilerman added that Wildberries' partnership with the Russian state-controlled VTB Bank made it a prime strategic target; since Wildberries was the "largest borrower in Russia", its crash would result in several banks (including VTB) collapsing.

By 10 August, major Russian lenders including Sberbank, VTB Bank, and Wildberries Bank, had declared their willingness to offer debt restructuring and write-off schemes to affected sellers and partners, and the Central Bank of Russia was encouraging them to do so; Sberbank said it had already received about 2,000 applications for loan restructuring for submitted by impacted business owners. Both Sberbank and VTB had heavily invested in Wildberries, were majority-state-owned, and the banking system of Russia was already in a crisis by the standards of the International Monetary Fund (IMF), and the general economy of Russia was "already in, or on the brink of, a recession and weighed down by Western sanctions and by funding the prolonged war." Many analysts thought the Kremlin could probably not afford bailing Sberbank and VTB out in case Wildberries collapsed completely.

==== Employee camera ban ====
On 3 August, Wildberries imposed a ban on carrying video cameras (including all smartphones with in-built cameras) into warehouse premises, supposedly to "protect" its employees, but more likely to prevent their employees from creating evidence of what is happening at Wildberries warehouses throughout the country, and spreading that evidence online through social media. Previously, dozens of regions of Russia including Moscow Oblast had banned filming the aftermath of Ukrainian attacks (such as Wildberries warehouses that were struck by drones and caught fire), or publishing photos or videos of it; this had already led to several civilians being arrested and detained.

==== Logistical information ban ====
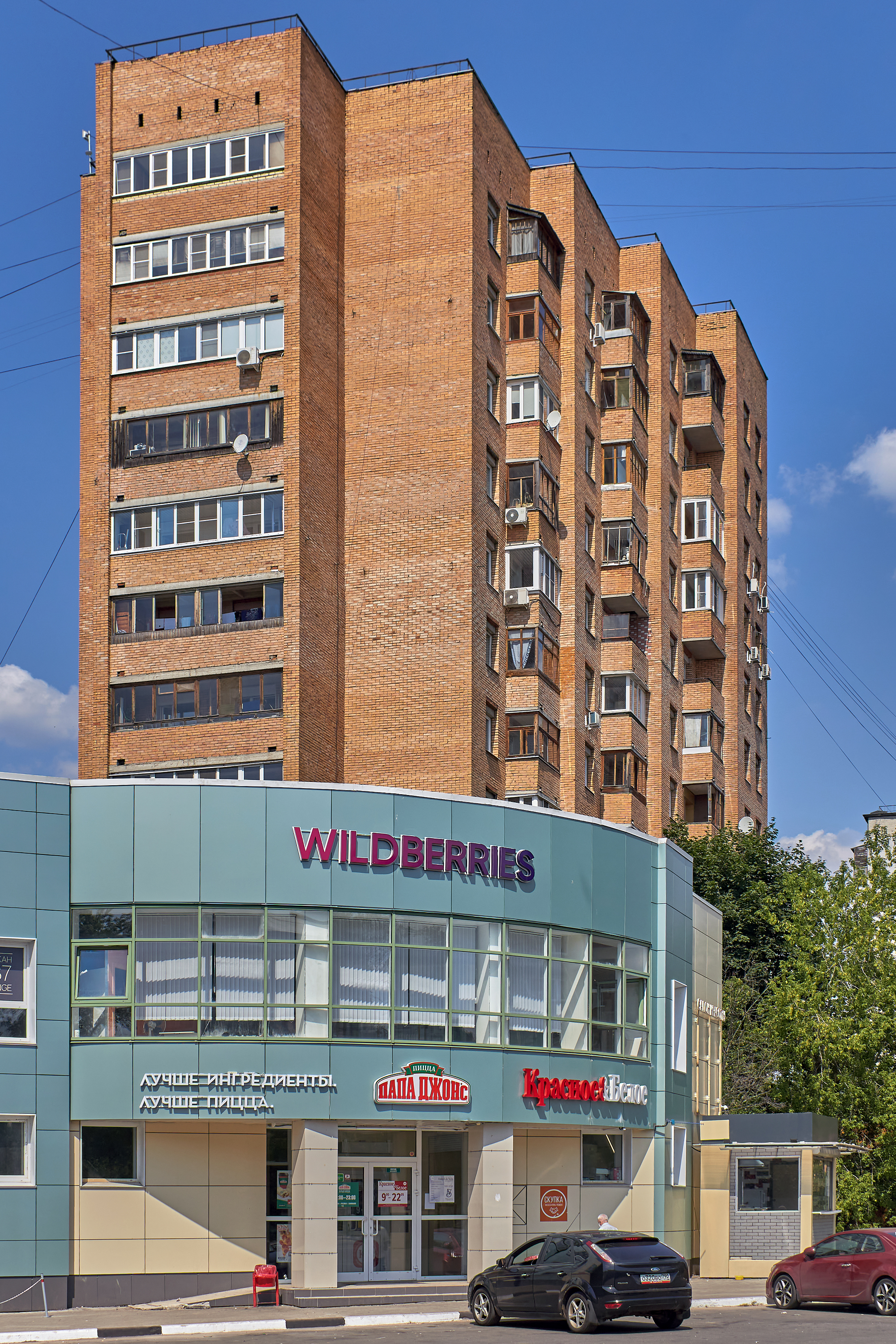
Wildberries pickup point in Elektrostal (pictured 2021)

On 17 August, Wildberries announced that it would remove all public information about warehouse addresses, schemes for sorting and storing goods, and construction of new logistics facilities and their planned areas of operation, for better physical security against drone strikes, employer and employee privacy, and cybersecurity. By that time, the company had already largely removed all data relating to its warehouse addresses on Google Maps, Yandex Maps, Yandex.Navigator and 2GIS. The Wildberries pickup point map would remain accessible to customers and partners.

==== Partial relocation to Belarus and Kazakhstan ====
On 28 July 2026, independent Belarusian outlet Nasha Niva noted that the 20,000 m^{2} capacity of a partially completed Wildberries warehouse, already under construction at the "Great Stone" China–Belarus Industrial Park south of Minsk, was already being used to store goods for delivery to the Central Federal District of Russia. Ever since the Wildberries warehouse in Elektrostal was destroyed in mid-July 2026, potential customers in Moscow Oblast would see goods physically stored in the Minsk warehouse appear in their search results.

The new logistics centre at the "Great Stone" park had a projected total capacity of 140,000 m^{2}, to be completed by the end of 2026 or the beginning of 2027; reportedly, the first sections of about 20,000 m^{2} had become operational in May 2026. On 5 August 2026, Kiryl Karatseey, First Deputy General Director for Park Development, stated that the construction of this Wildberries facilities would be hurried up, because: "The current circumstances in the territory of the Russian Federation compel the investor to build as quickly as possible." This statement caused a flurry of concerns and rumours amongst the public about the new building not being up to quality standards, or the bulk of Wildberries' inventory being rushedly moved from Russia to Belarus, prompting Wildberries' press service to issue a statement to Minskaya Pravda against what it called 'unnecessary speculation': "Wildberries continues to systematically develop its logistics infrastructure in all countries where it operates. The company stressed that the construction of warehouse facilities is proceeding in line with the approved plans, while recent media reports about accelerated construction or the possible relocation of its main logistics capacity outside Russia do not reflect the actual situation."

On 29 July 2026, Kommersant reported that Wildberries was seeking to lease 100,000 m^{2} extra warehouse space in Kazakhstan as well, in order to protect its goods from Ukrainian strikes. One of the four commercial real estate market sources cited by Kommersant said Wildberries "was prepared to lease all available warehouse capacity in the country", although IBC Global said that as of the end of June 2026, only 130,000 m^{2} was available, scattered across various Kazakhstani cities.

Construction of two Wildberries warehouses in Astana and Almaty in Kazakhstan (combined capacity: 260,000 square metres, of which 160,000 in Astana) was first announced in the beginning of 2023, but the planned opening in 2025 was postponed; as of August 2026, their completion was not expected until 2027. Aside from those, Wildberries had only 46,000 m^{2} of storage space and a market share of 27% in Kazakhstan, greatly overshadowed by competitor Kaspi.kz, which served about 64% of the Kazakhstani online retail market as of February 2026. While some journalists speculated that Wildberries could be seeking to acquire even more storage space in neutral Kazakhstan in order to keep its goods safe against Ukrainian drone strikes, the government of Kazakhstan seemed to take a protectionist stance, with the Minister of Trade and Integration Arman Şaqqaliev recommending citizens on 4 August 2026 to "use our domestic marketplaces. We call this economic patriotism. We currently have a very high share of domestic marketplaces, so, of course, we should try to order locally," because that was the only guarantee that products ordered would be delivered.

Meanwhile, Wildberries was also seeking additional storage space inside Russia itself, but owners of vacant facilities had become very reluctant to offer their spaces due to the risk of being targeted by Ukrainian drone strikes next.

=== Ozon ===
After five Ozon warehouses were struck by Ukrainian drones on 22–24 August 2026, Ozon shares dropped by 27%, the lowest level since August 2023. More broadly, Ozon had lost 47% of its overall value since the start of the year 2026. Ozon said its warehouses in Adygeysk and Nevinnomyssk were only evacuated, and the facilities and goods inside were undamaged, whereas Ukraine claimed the Nevinnomyssk facility had been struck.

According the Anti-Corruption Foundation, the largest stakeholder of Ozon (worth 38 billion rubles) is linked to the inner circle of Putin through a chain of obscure organisations; therefore, by damaging Ozon's assets, Putin's personal wealth is being attacked.

When an Ozon logistics hub in Belgorod was struck and caught fire on 30 August, two Ozon employees were reportedly killed, including a 16-year-old deaf schoolboy. Independent news service Verstka reported on 8 September that the employment agency Ozon Job banned underage employees from working at any of the affected warehouses in Belgorod Oblast and Bashkortostan, as well as some unaffected Ozon warehouses in Kursk Oblast and Bryansk Oblast: "As of 27 August in Ufa, and 1 September in Belgorod, Kursk, and Bryansk, it is not technically possible to book new shift slots for underage users. Existing bookings will also be cancelled, so we ask you not to come to the site."

=== Russia ===
==== Retaliatory strikes against Ukrainian warehouses ====
Ever since the Wildberries strikes began, journalists and analysts observed an uptick in Russian attacks on Ukrainian logistics infrastructure as well. The Kyiv Post listed "leading supermarket chains, warehouses belonging to the major retail chains Rozetka and Epicentr, warehouses of the Novus and Silpo supermarket chains, as well as storage facilities belonging to many well-known brands", as examples amongst those damaged in a single massive Russian attack on the night of 5 August 2026 on the Ukrainian capital city of Kyiv. Although the Kremlin framed such attacks as "responding" to, or "retaliation" for, Ukrainian strikes on Wildberries warehouses, the Kyiv Post argued that Russia had been attacking civilian infrastructure in Ukraine fairly indiscriminately since launching its full-scale invasion of Ukraine in February 2022, whereas the Ukrainian military had avoided targeting "commercial infrastructure [in Russia until] less than a year ago", namely in spring 2026, by which time it had become clear that nominally civilian infrastructure such as Wildberries warehouses had become actively used for military and dual-use purposes in the war-effort against Ukraine. The Post conceded that the deep strike campaign against Russia's oil refineries began somewhat earlier, in 2024, as oil refining infrastructure was more clearly tied to military logistics.

By September 2026, attacks had destroyed 40 % of the modern warehousing capacity in Ukraine, or 2 out of 5 million square meters.

On 8 October 2026, The New York Times compared how Ukraine had been seeking to minimise civilian casualties when striking warehouses, while Russia took a more reckless approach:

"Two months of frequent strikes on Wildberries and Ozon facilities killed 12 people and injured 135 through Sept. 11, according to the Conflict Intelligence Team, an open-source research group tracking wartime civilian casualties. By comparison, Russia killed more Ukrainians in a single attack on a shopping mall in the Ukrainian city of Kryvyi Rih on Aug. 21. In that strike, 16 people died and another 136 were injured, according to the research group."

==== Decree 604: Russian state intervention in warehouse control and repairs ====
On 19 August 2026, Putin ordered the government to launch a state programme of rebuilding commercial warehouses that were damaged or destroyed by Ukrainian drone strikes. Although he did not mention Wildberries specifically, this has been taken as direct state intervention in repair and reconstruction efforts of Wilberries warehouses. On 24 August, Putin issued presidential decree no. 604 by which the Russian state can temporarily take control or even acquire formal ownership rights of physical and financial assets of critically important infrastructure if the state judges the entities (companies, organisations or otherwise) responsible for certain facilities to have failed in their responsibility to protect them (when security measures are missing or deemed ineffective), or are too slow to repair them after they have been attacked. Decree 604 applies to facilities for fuel, energy, industry, communications, transportation, logistics and other objects which the state regards as critically important for its security and economic stability. Deputy Prime Minister Denis Manturov denied that the decree was a step towards nationalisation: "This does not involve nationalisation or a change of ownership. The decree provides for the state to take part in managing an enterprise in order to address specific security issues." The next day, Kremlin spokesman Dmitry Peskov said that "often business owners do not pay enough attention to taking measures to ensure safety, anti-drone safety," so "we must take measures, we must ensure our own safety."

Journalists interpreted Decree 604 as applying primarily to online retail warehouses such as those of Wildberries and Ozon, as well as the oil refineries, dozens of which had been struck with deeply disruptive effects in the months prior. Reuters and the Kyiv Post connected it to the state programme to rebuild e-commerce hubs announced a week earlier. The Associated Press highlighted the view of Russian political analyst Abbas Gallyamov, who argued the measure was designed to force owners of repeatedly damaged oil refineries into repairing the facilities: "Given the fact that the same refinery has already been hit three to five times, it's safe to assume that the owners are now reluctant to invest in restoring what’s been destroyed. Why spend billions if they're going to get hit again tomorrow?" Gallyamov regarded Decree 604 as the Kremlin's response to this reluctance: "If you don't finance the restoration of the refineries, we'll take them away from you." Other sources consulted by AP pointed out that the Russian state was already burdened by having to financially bail out Wildberries, other retailers and their sellers and customers for compensation of losses, or providing funds for repairs, or assigning additional security assets or measures (air defence systems, drone netting and so on) to protect civilian infrastructure; Decree 604 may have been designed to force companies to do those things themselves rather than relying on government handouts.

The Associated Press reasoned that taking over damaged warehouses or refineries could be a potential source of future state revenues at a time when the Russian government was struggling with budget deficits. On the other hand, damaged assets would also represent additional financial burdens on the state: they still needed to be repaired first to become profitable again, and protected against future drone strikes, whereas the air defence assets and measures available to the Kremlin were already stretched, and could hardly adequately protect all of Russia's vast territory. In May 2026, the State Duma already approved a bill granting several financial services such as the state-owned Central Bank and Sberbank the right to install air defence systems on their premises; RBC cited anonymous sources from the Russian Ministry of Defence at the time suggesting that other companies could be given the right to do the same. The Kyiv Post said that Decree 604 was vague in defining what level of anti-drone protection was required, or the time limit for repairing a damaged facility, "leav[ing] the Kremlin broad discretion to decide when a company has failed." Nor does the decree define how long the Russian state can retain "temporary" management over a facility of a failing company, meaning it could be indefinitely. The Federal Agency for State Property Management (Rosimushchestvo) would normally take control of such a facility for temporary management, but with presidential approval, the Kremlin could assign it to another entity, "potentially even a direct competitor. An unwanted owner could be pushed aside without any formal change in ownership." The Kyiv Post concluded that Decree 604 may stop short of formal nationalisation, but private ownership may eventually only exist on paper, just like in the Soviet Union, with the state taking control of private enterprises under the pretext of security and wartime necessity.

=== Ukraine ===
On 4 August, Zelenskyy renewed the 40-day influence operation announced on 25 June to push Russia toward ending the war. UATV had reported that the 40-day operation had to date damaged 80% of Wildberries logistics centres and that U.S. Secretary of State Marco Rubio had acknowledged the 40-day operation by saying "long-range strikes by Ukraine's armed forces have changed the dynamics of the war."

== Wildberries Special Military Operation product tags ==
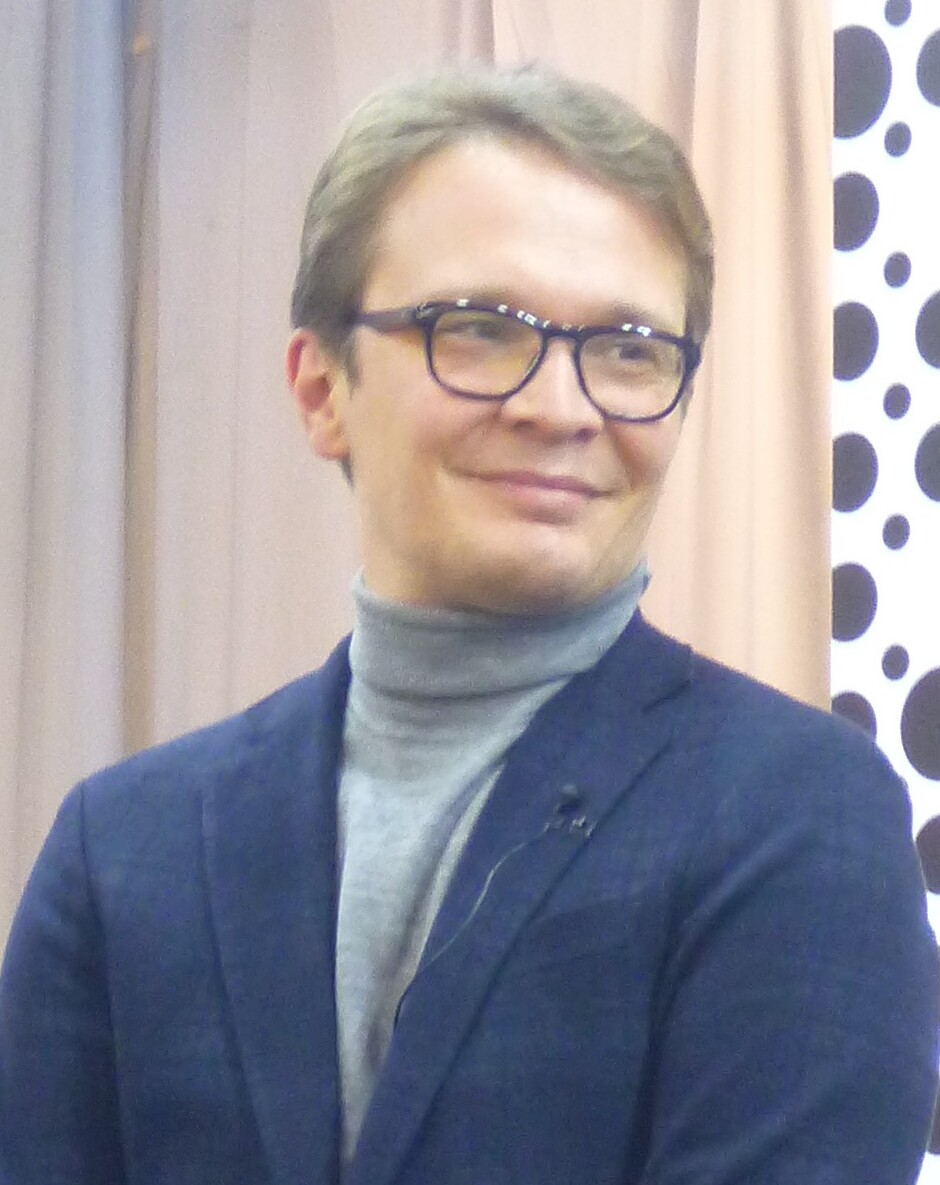
Kirill Martynov, editor-in-chief of Novaya Gazeta Europe, wrote on 18 July 2026: "In theory, one solution could be to stop selling goods from the "SMO range", but this is impossible for political reasons: the marketplaces are closely linked to the Russian government, even though they are formally private companies."

As soon as the Ukrainian drone strikes on the warehouses of Russian online retail company Wildberries began on 18 July 2026, and the question was raised whether these warehouses were legitimate military targets, journalists in Ukraine, Russia and around the world confirmed that a wide range of military and dual-use products were sold on its website. Kirill Martynov, editor-in-chief of Novaya Gazeta Europe, wrote the same day that Wildberries warehouses would functionally fulfil the Geneva Conventions criteria as military targets:

Wildberries actively sells military equipment, including body armour and surveillance devices: this reflects the demand structure, where mercenaries are becoming one of the most solvent mass consumer groups, and the "on-the-run" deliveries look like private enterprise. But most importantly, Russian marketplaces, including Wildberries, are actively supplying drone components to the front lines — that is, components for lethal weapons, which are used, among other things, to attack civilian targets in Ukraine.

The term "Special Military Operation (SMO)" (Russian: специа́льная вое́нная опера́ция (сво), romanized: spetsial'naya voyennaya operatsiya (svo)) is the official name of the 2022 Russian invasion of Ukraine used by the Russian government and Kremlin-aligned media, and Wildberries has been using the abbreviation "сво" extensively for product tags on its website, Wildberries.ru (available in Russian and English). Some product or brand categories lack the abbreviation "сво", but would only be expected for military products, not civilian or dual use products, such as "army tactical first-aid kit". On 21 July 2026, Kremlin spokesman Dmitry Peskov denied accusations from Ukraine that Wildberries handled military supplies. The Moscow Times observed on 26 July 2026 that for certain tags, the items had all been removed, even if the tag itself still worked. Some of the items were moved to different product tags, such as "Sport" (Спорт) for body armour and protective helmets. Both before and after some tags were removed on 26 July, Wildberries and the Kremlin have continued to deny the claim that Wildberries warehouses were being used as logistics centres for military equipment.

Selected search results for SMO-related product tags on Wildberries.ru in August 2026:

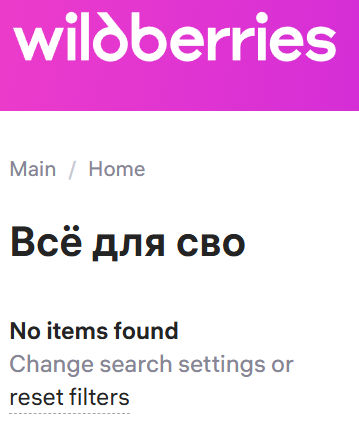
Everything for the SMO (No items found)

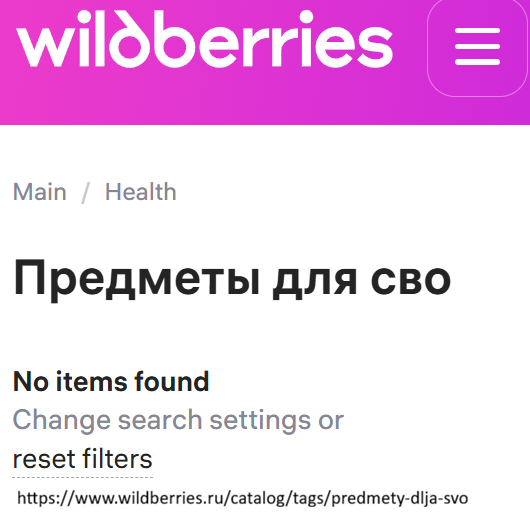
Items for the SMO (No items found)

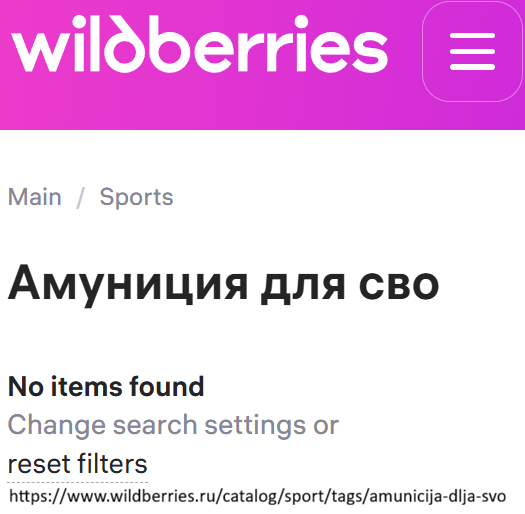
Ammunition for the SMO (No items found)

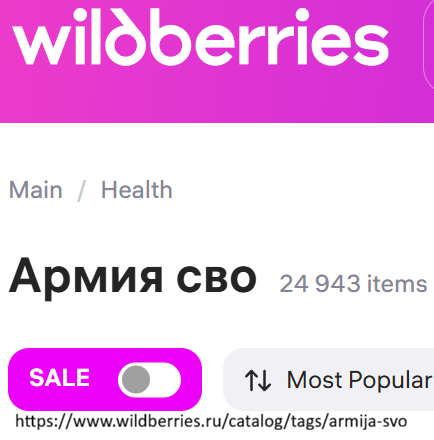
Army SMO

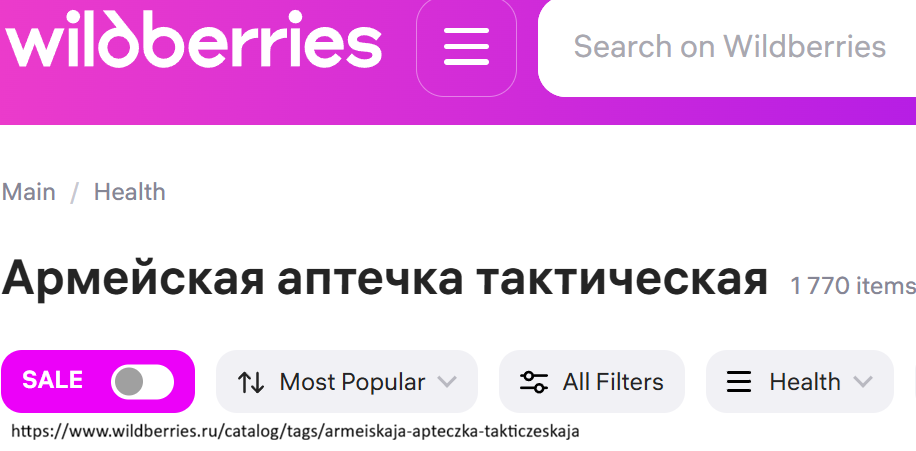
Army tactical first-aid kit

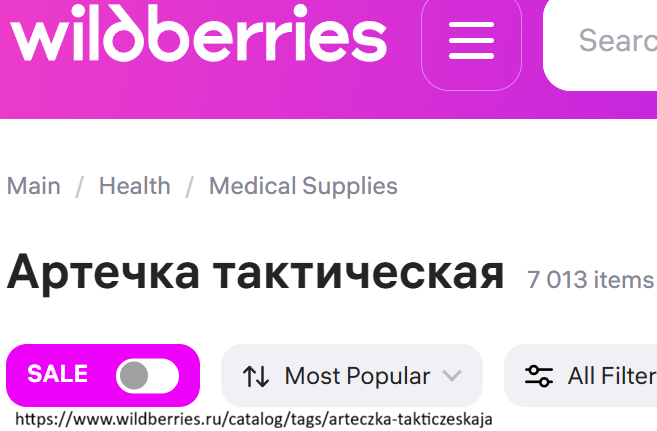
Tactical first-aid kit

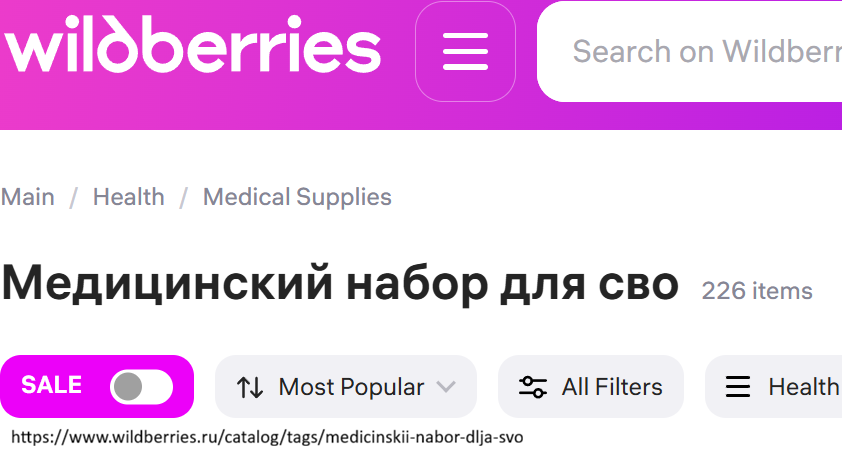
Medicine kit for the SMO

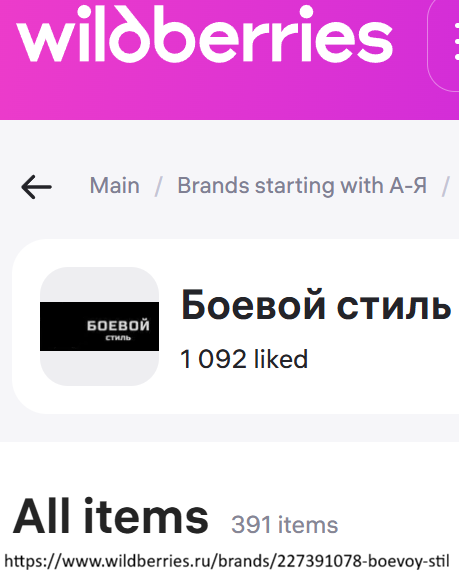
Brand "Fighting Style"

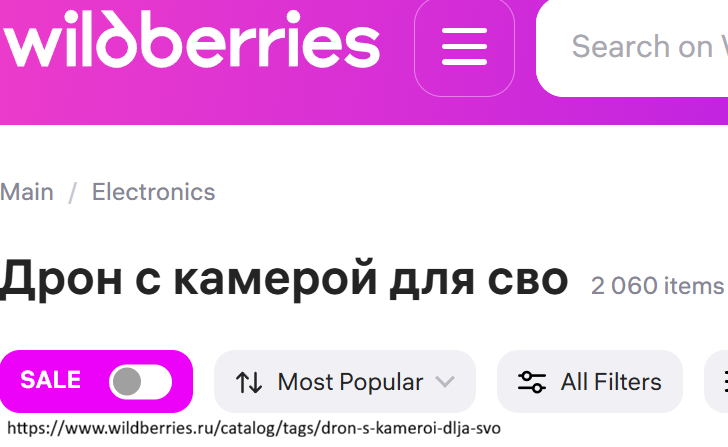
Drone with camera for the SMO

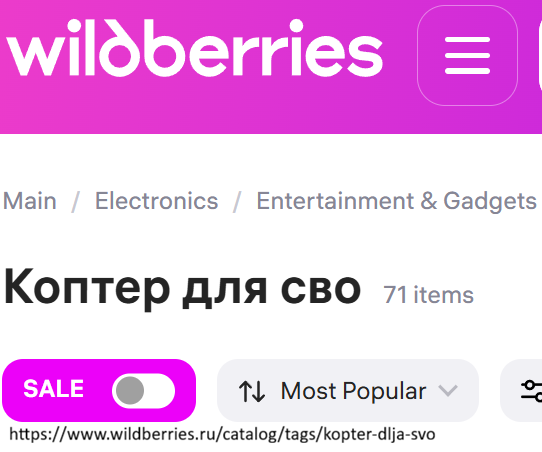
Copter (drone) for the SMO

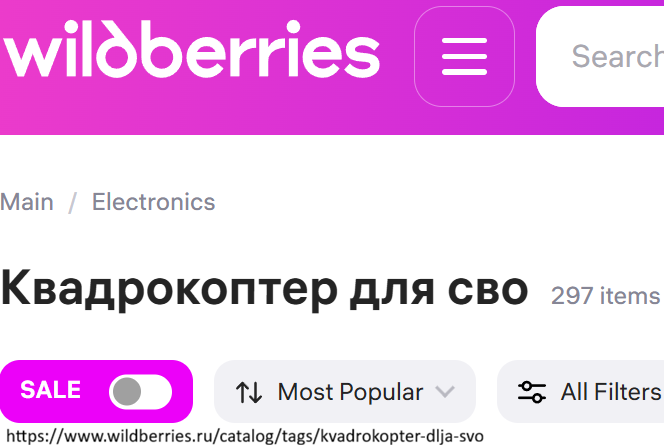
Quadcopter for the SMO

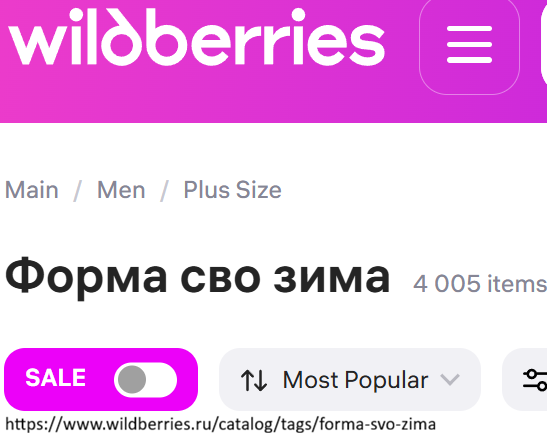
Winter uniform for the SMO

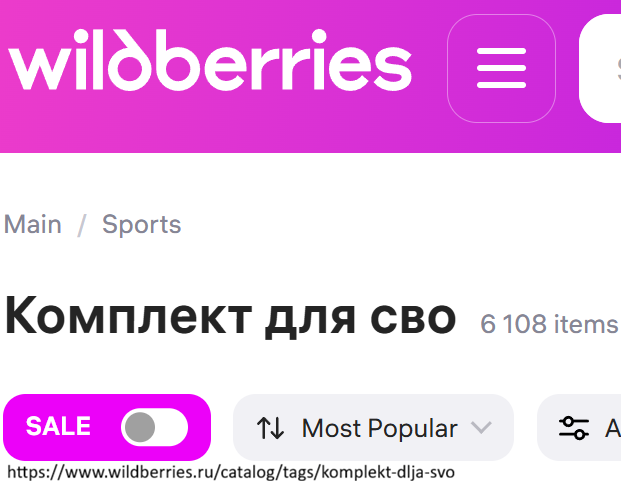
Outfit for the SMO

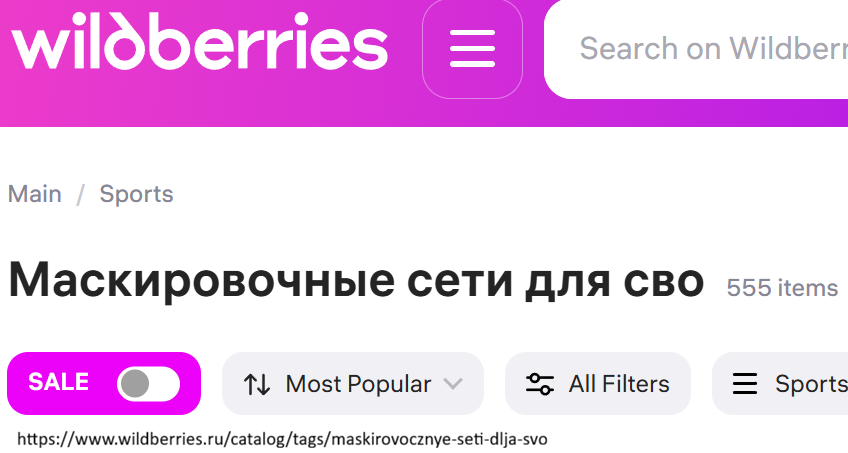
Camouflage nets for the SMO

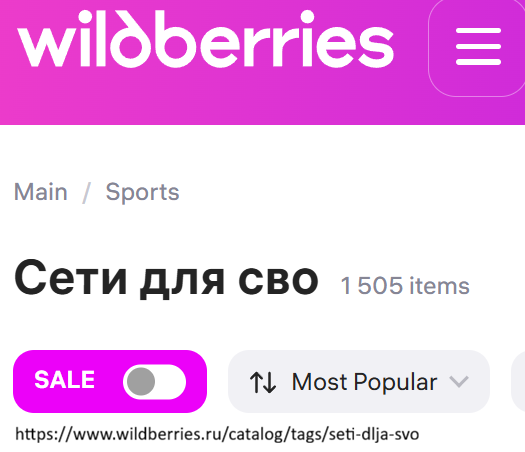
Nets for the SMO

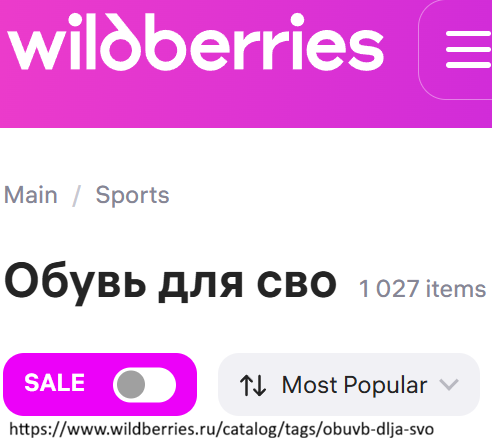
Footwear for the SMO

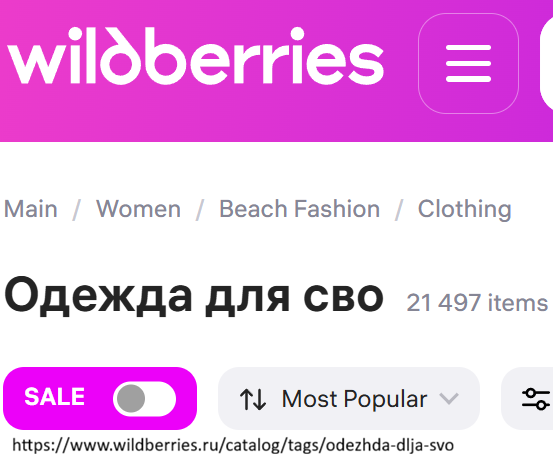
Clothing for the SMO

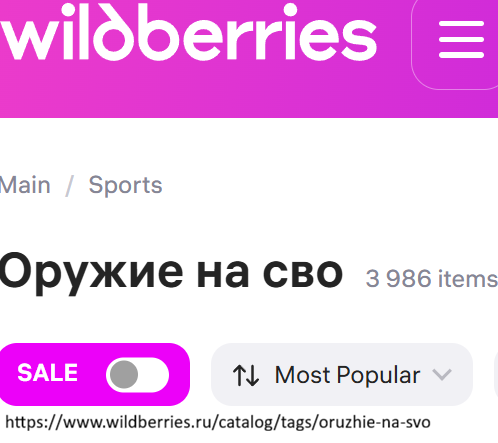
Weapons for the SMO

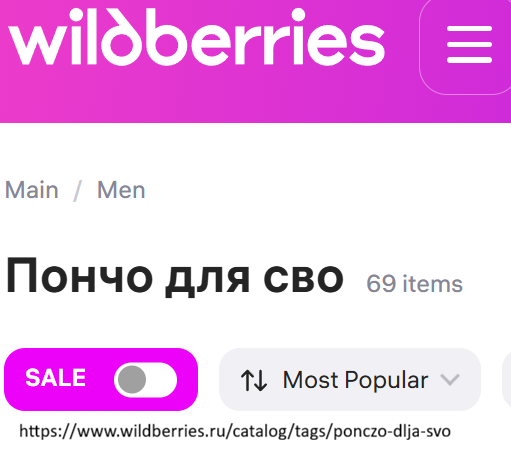
Poncho for the SMO

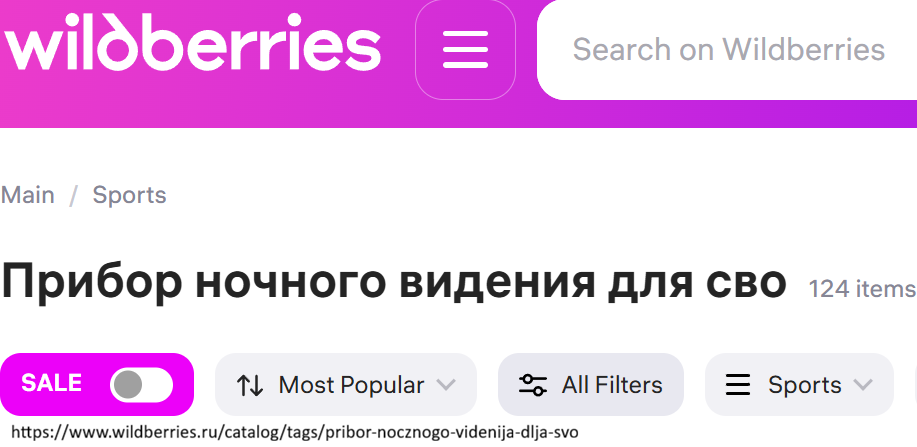
Night-vision device for the SMO

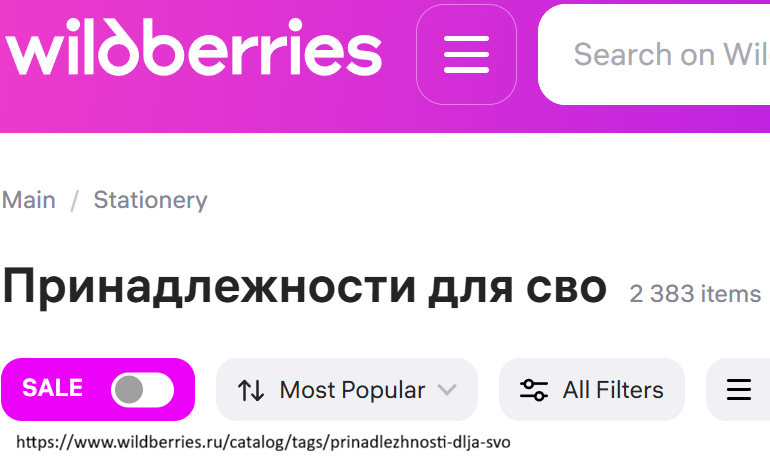
Accessories for the SMO

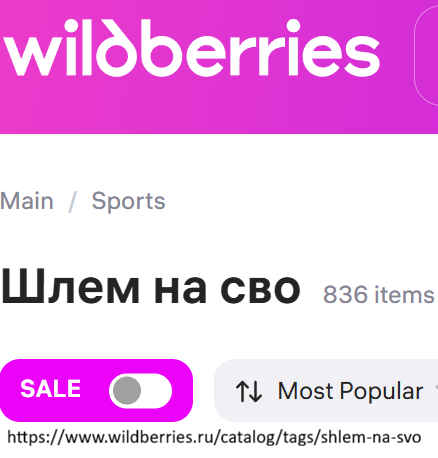
Helmet in the SMO

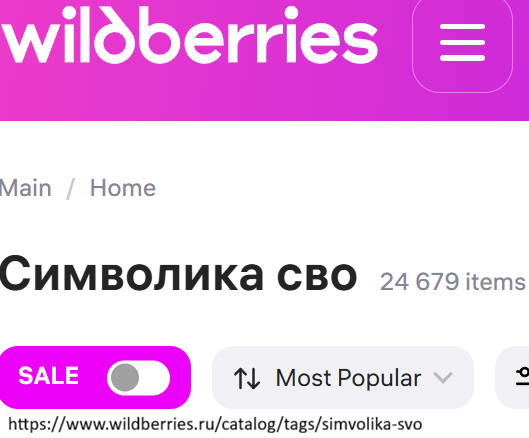
Symbolism of the SMO

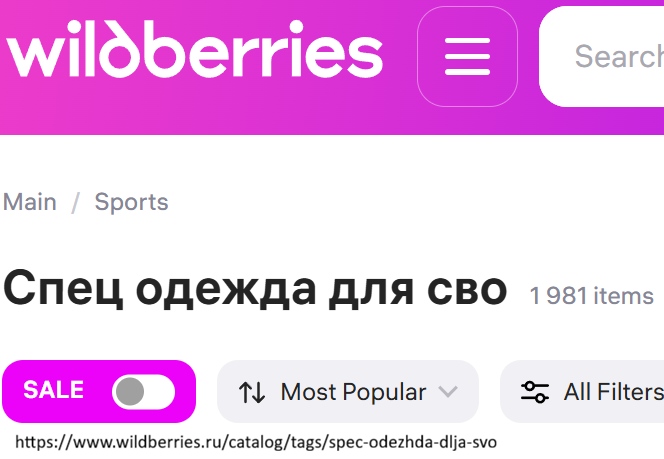
Specialist clothing for the SMO

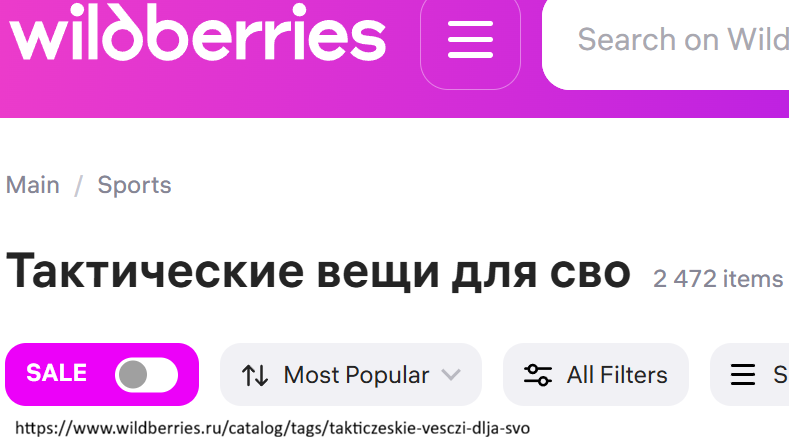
Tactical gear for the SMO

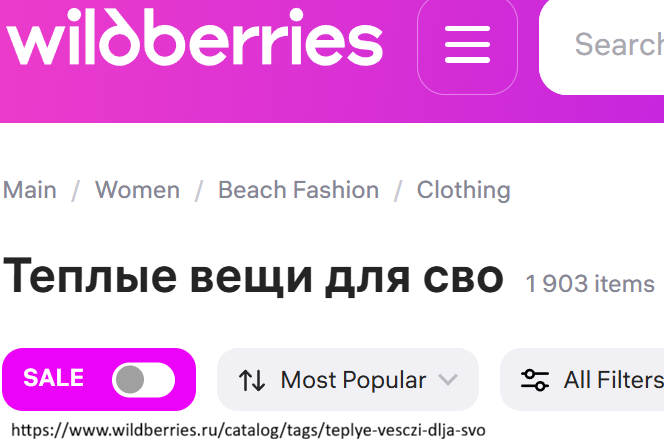
Warm clothes for the SMO

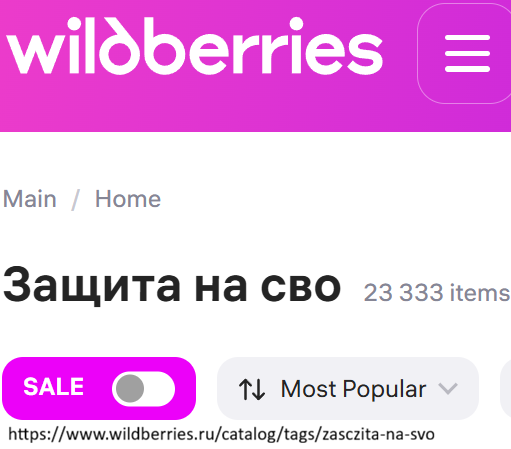
Protection in the SMO

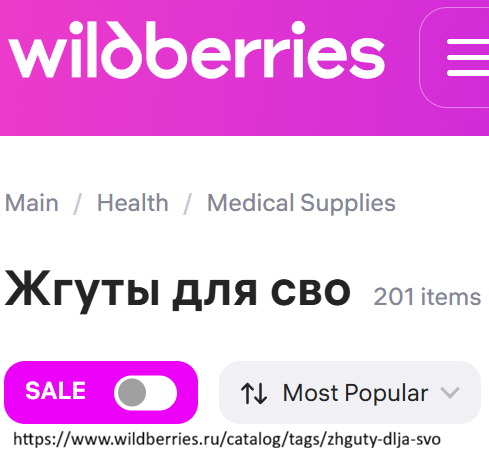
Wiring harnesses for the SMO

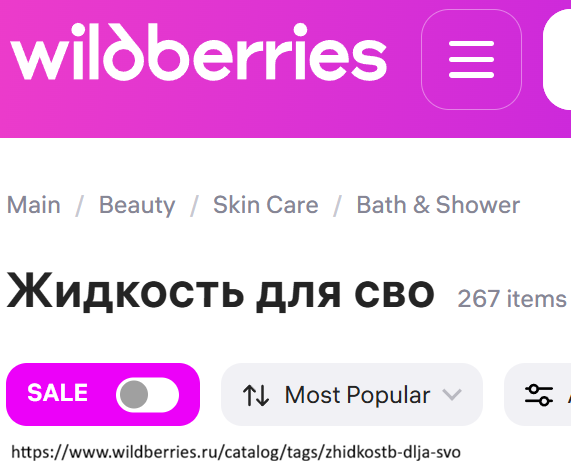
Liquids for the SMO

== See also ==
- Deep strike campaign
  - Operation MoLoChKa (July 2026, Sea of Azov)
- Long-range sanctions
- Attacks in Russia during the Russo-Ukrainian war (2022–present)
