= Dakhadayevka =

Dakhadayevka Дахадаевка
- Selo
- Location within Republic of Dagestan Location within Russia
- Coordinates: 43°06′N 47°26′E
- Country: Russia
- Region: Republic of Dagestan
- District: Kumtorkalinsky District
- Time zone: UTC+3:00

Dakhadayevka (Russian: Дахадаевка) is a rural locality (a selo) in Korkmaskalinsky Selsoviet, Kumtorkalinsky District, Republic of Dagestan, Russia. The population was 284 as of 2010. Selo was based in 1901.

== Nationalities ==
Avars, Dargins and Kumyks live there.

== Geography ==
Dakhadayevka is located 32 km northeast of Korkmaskala (the district's administrative centre) by road. Tukhchar and Gamiyakh are the nearest rural localities.
