= Ozon =

Russian e-commerce company

Ozon Holdings PLC
- Type: Public
- Traded as: MCX: OZON; Nasdaq: OZON
- Industry: E-commerce, technology, retail
- Founded: 1998; 28 years ago
- Headquarters: Moscow, Russia
- Area served: Russia, Belarus, Kazakhstan, Turkmenistan, Uzbekistan, Azerbaijan, Georgia, Kyrgyzstan, Mongolia, and Armenia
- Revenue: 724.9 billions roubles (9.02 billions $US) (2025)
- Operating income: 58.9 billions roubles (- 73 millions $US) (2025)
- Net income: 58.9 billions roubles (- 73 millions $US) (2025)
- Total assets: ▲RUB 284,821,000,000; (2022)
- Number of employees: 49,889 (2025)
- Website: corp.ozon.com

Ozon Holdings PLC is one of the first e-commerce companies in Russia, sometimes referred to as "the Amazon of Russia". Established in 1998 as an online bookstore, Ozon was one of the three biggest online retail platforms in the country by 2019. It was named as the #3 most valuable Russian internet company of 2020 by Forbes.

Ozon is part of Ozon Group, which also owns the online travel booking platform Ozon. Travel and a stake in Russia's largest digital bookstore Litres. The current chief executive officer of Ozon is Alexander Shulgin, who joined the company after serving as chief financial officer and later chief operating officer of Yandex.

In October 2020, it was reported that Ozon had plans to hold an IPO in the United States that could value the company at $3-5 billion. In November 2020, Ozon went public on the Nasdaq in an IPO that valued the company at $6.2 billion. Following the Russian invasion of Ukraine in February 2022, Nasdaq suspended trading in the company's securities and then announced its intention to delist. Ozon unsuccessfully appealed twice, and in October 2023 announced a voluntary delisting.

== History ==
Ozon.ru was established in 1998 as an online bookseller by the Russian software house Reksoft. The company soon expanded its assortment to CDs and DVDs before going on to sell a wide range of goods from clothing to electronics. In 2012, it acquired the shoe seller Sapato.ru and sold it in 2015 to the online fashion retailer KupiVIP. In 2014, it acquired a stake in Litres, a major Russia's e-book marketplace.

=== Leadership ===
After a series of Russian chief executive officers, in 2005 Ozon appointed Bernard Lukey, who had advised the company on behalf of Baring Vostok. In 2011, Maëlle Gavet became the new chief executive officer of Ozon. During her tenure, the firm worked to popularize e-commerce in the mainly cash-based Russian retail market. Gavet stepped down as chief executive officer in 2015; her deputy Danny Perekalsky was appointed successor.

In 2017, Alexander Shulgin, the former chief financial officer and chief operating officer of the Russian tech company Yandex, was made the chief executive officer of Ozon. In April 2022, Mr. Shulgin bowed out as CEO and member of the board of directors of Ozon due to international sanctions during the Russo-Ukrainian War.

=== Funding ===
In 1999, ru-Net Holdings, founded by Leonid Boguslavsky along with the Western Baring Vostok Group, UFG and Rex Capital, purchased a controlling stake in the company for $3 million. In 2000, Baring Vostok became a controlling shareholder after investing $3 million into the company. In 2007, Ozon raised $18 million in a funding round led by the Geneva-based Index Ventures.

In 2011, Ozon attracted $100 million in investment from Japanese e-commerce company Rakuten, Boguslavsky's ru-Net and others, followed by another $150 million funding deal with the Russian conglomerate Sistema and the Russian mobile operator MTS in 2014. MTS and Baring Vostok invested another $92 million into Ozon in 2018. In 2019, Boguslavsky sold his share in Ozon to the company's main shareholders, Baring Vostok and Sistema, for $70 million.

In 2019 Ozon secured a $150 million round of financing with the participation of U.S. venture capital firm Princeville Capital, in what was reported to be one of the largest Russian tech investment deals involving Western backers since 2014.

According the Anti-Corruption Foundation, the largest stakeholder of Ozon (worth 38 billion rubles) is linked to the inner circle of president Vladimir Putin through a chain of obscure organisations.

=== Financial performance ===
Ozon reported a "hypergrowth" stage in 2019 as sales for the year increased by 93% to $1.1 billion and the volume of orders more than doubled to 32.2 million. Company turnover by gross merchandise volume (GMV) grew 188% year on year in the second quarter of 2020 and reached RUB 77.4 billion by H12020, an increase of 152% from the same period in the previous year. According to Daniil Fedorov, Ozon's chief financial officer at the time, the coronavirus pandemic created a new habit of shopping online among Russian consumers. In 2024, revenue amounted to 615.7 billion rubles (an increase of 45%), gross profit – 99.9 billion rubles.

On 24 August 2026, Ozon fell nearly 30% on the Moscow Exchange and its major shareholder Sistema was down over 13% after a series of drone strikes on their warehouses from Ukraine.

=== Ozon Bank ===
In 2021, Ozon acquired Oney Bank from Sovcombank for around $10 million and soon renamed it Ozon Bank. After Russia's full-scale invasion of Ukraine, the Office of Foreign Assets Control (OFAC) added the bank to the Specially Designated Nationals and Blocked Persons List (SDN List) on the basis of its connection to Sovcombank, but removed them in late March 2022 after an appeal by its parent company. In the summer of 2026, the United Kingdom placed new sanctions on the bank, as did the European Union which also placed sanctions on its shareholder Sistema.

=== 2022 fire at the Istra (Moscow) fulfilment centre ===
On August 3, 2022, a large fire destroyed approx 50,000SQM of warehouse (Approx 1/3rd of the building) including the contents of the building the external walls and roof. At least one person died and 13 were injured in the fire. The emergencies ministry initially said the fire had spread to an area of 35,000 square metres but later revised this to approx 50,000SQM. A fire-pumping station, an Mi-8 helicopter, two Ka-32 helicopters, 150 firefighters and 40 other pieces of equipment were deployed to the scene, it said.

== Products and services ==
Ozon offers more than 9 million products across more than 20 product categories including clothing, groceries, home goods and electronics. After a large increase in the available assortment, the volume of orders more than doubled in 2019 to 32.2 million.

In early 2019, the company launched a service called Ozon.Invest that grants loans to small and medium-sized businesses that sell their products on the Ozon marketplace. Ozon was also the first online retailer in Russia to launch consumer loans for multi-category online purchases, as well as its own debit card with a cashback feature.

Ozon has been operating a marketplace platform for third-party sellers since 2018. In June 2020, the marketplace had more than 13,000 sellers who accounted for more than 85% of the assortment on the site.

In November 2021 “Ozon” announced the opening of pilot pickup mini-points, at least 15 square meters each, in small Russian towns from the beginning of 2022.

In August 2022, Ozon announced the launch of an ad service for the sale of goods from individuals. The pilot region was the Rostov region.

== Supply chain and delivery ==
Ozon developed its own fulfillment infrastructure to deliver orders in Russia's 11 time zones. In 2018 the company had seven fulfillment centers in the Moscow region as well as St. Petersburg, Tver, Kazan, Ekaterinburg, Rostov-On-Don and Novosibirsk. It more than doubled its fulfilment capacity in 2019 to almost 200,000 sqm, as well as investing in its last-mile delivery infrastructure.

The company operates its own delivery logistics platform and has a network of over 16,000 pickup points, including automated parcel lockers across Russia. The use of brick-and-mortar pickup points where customers can pick up their orders arose out of a lack of reliable third-party delivery services in many parts of Russia.

In 2019, Ozon launched an express grocery delivery service in Moscow, and rolled out its contactless home delivery service, which became a popular option during the coronavirus pandemic in the spring of 2020.

In March 2020, Ozon announced plans to spend more than $300 million to expand its logistics in advance of a potential IPO. In October 2021, “Ozon Express” brand launched in Moscow inhouse ready-to-serve food production with one hour delivery with up to 30 dishes by the end of 2021. “Ozon Express” culinary production is expected to be available in other regions of Russia. In December 2021, "Ozon" announced to be ready to launch by the end of the year 2021 the 15-minutes delivery of groceries and pre-prepared food in 30 districts of Moscow by virtue of company`s darkstores.

== COVID-19 pandemic ==
Ozon reported record sales growth during the coronavirus pandemic, as quarantine measures in Russia drove more people to shop online. During the crisis, the company capped prices on the most sought-after goods to prevent price gouging by marketplace sellers and expanded its contactless home delivery service to limit the spread of infection.

In July 2020, Ozon and four other Russian retailers commissioned a monument to delivery workers who continued to work during lockdown in Moscow.

== Russian invasion of Ukraine ==
Beginning on 18 July 2026, Ukraine launched a series of drone attacks on Wildberries warehouses, Ozon's main competitor, as part of a counter-attack operation on Russia during the Russian invasion of Ukraine. Some analysts viewed the extension of such attacks to Ozon warehouses as an inevitability. On 31 July, a drone crashed near an Ozon warehouse in Zelendolsk, Tatarstan, though due to its proximity to a Wildberries warehouse it is uncertain which building was being targeted. However, on the same day, commander of the Unmanned Systems Forces of Ukraine Robert Brovdi posted a cryptic message saying "the ozone concentration exceeds the critical norm", possibly referencing the e-commerce company.

On 21 and 22 August 2026, Ukrainian drones struck warehouses in Chapayevsk, Samara Oblast, in Orenburg, Orenburg Oblast, and in Zelenodolsk, Republic of Tatarstan. On 24 August, four more locations were targeted. According to Ozon, fires broke out in logistics hubs in Makhachkala, Dagestan and Enem on the outskirts of Krasnodar and evacuations were made in warehouses in Adygeysk, Adygeya and Nevinnomyssk, Stavropol despite being undamaged, however Ukrainian publications say all four sites were hit.

On 27 August, two additional centers were targeted. Ozon stated that they would temporarily suspend operations after minor damage to their facility in Ufa, Bashkortostan and that a facility in Orenburg had been evacuated, but later resumed normal operations. A small fire broke out after a strike on a logistics hub in Rostov on 29 August. Employee evacuations were made in advance as a result of regional drone warnings. Two warehouses rented by Ozon were hit in the city of Belgorod on 30 August, causing all operations to be suspended in Belgorod Oblast.

On 1 September, Ozon announced that it would offer sellers free transportation of their products to logistics centers in Almaty and Astana, Kazakhstan until the end of the month to protect their goods from further strikes on their Russian locations. On 11 September, a warehouse in Saratov was struck after a brief pause in such attacks, halting all operations in Saratov Oblast.

On the night of 17–18 October, an Ozon warehouse in the Petro-Slavyanka district of Saint Petersburg was attacked by drones, with a spokesperson for the company saying that a fire had started and all personnel had been evacuated. A week later, on 24 October 2026, an Ozon logistics hub was hit in Omsk in south-western Siberia, 2,500 kilometres (1,550 miles) from Ukraine. On the night of 3–4 November, an Ozon warehouse in Adygeysk in the Russian Republic of Adygea was set alight by Ukrainian drones, with all the stock listed as for sale in the facility being moved and new goods being diverted.
