= Uchkent =

Uchkent Учкент Уьчгент
- Selo
- Location within Republic of Dagestan Location within Russia
- Coordinates: 43°06′N 47°04′E
- Country: Russia
- Region: Republic of Dagestan
- District: Kumtorkalinsky District
- Time zone: UTC+3:00

Uchkent (Russian: Учкент; Kumyk: Уьчгент, Üçgent) is a rural locality (a selo) in Kumtorkalinsky District, Republic of Dagestan, Russia. The population was 3,702 as of 2010. There are 45 streets.

== Geography ==
Uchkent is located 21 km northwest of Korkmaskala (the district's administrative centre) by road. Novy Chirkey and Temirgoye are the nearest rural localities.

== Nationalities ==
Kumyks and Avars live there.
