= Temirgoye =

Temirgoye Темиргое Темиркъую
- Selo
- Location within Republic of Dagestan Location within Russia
- Coordinates: 43°07′N 47°08′E
- Country: Russia
- Region: Republic of Dagestan
- District: Kumtorkalinsky District
- Time zone: UTC+3:00

Temirgoye (Russian: Темиргое; Kumyk: Темиркъую, Temirquyu) is a rural locality (selo) in Kumtorkalinsky District, Republic of Dagestan, Russia. The population was 1,916 as of 2010. There are 15 streets.

== Geography ==
Temirgoye is located 20 kilometres (12 mi) northwest of Korkmaskala (the district's administrative centre) by road. Uchkent and Novy Chirkey are the nearest rural localities.

== Nationalities ==
Avars, Kumyks and Russians live there.
