= Almalo, Republic of Dagestan =

Almalo Алмало
- Selo
- Location within Republic of Dagestan Location within Russia
- Coordinates: 43°05′N 47°13′E
- Country: Russia
- Region: Republic of Dagestan
- District: Kumtorkalinsky District
- Time zone: UTC+3:00

Almalo (Russian: Алмало, Kumyk: Алмалы юрт, romanized: Almalı yurt) is a rural locality (a selo) in Kumtorkalinsky District, Republic of Dagestan, Russia. The population was 1,619 as of 2010. There are 10 streets.

== Geography ==
Almalo is located 12 km northwest of Korkmaskala (the district's administrative centre) by road. Tyube and Temirgoye are the nearest rural localities.

== Nationalities ==
Kumyks
