= Ardzhidada =

Ardzhidada Аджидада Мусакай-отар
- Selo
- Location within Republic of Dagestan Location within Russia
- Coordinates: 43°17′N 47°04′E
- Country: Russia
- Region: Republic of Dagestan
- District: Kumtorkalinsky District
- Time zone: UTC+3:00

Ardzhidada (Russian: Аджидада; Kumyk: Мусакай-отар, Musakay-otar) is a rural locality (a selo) in Kumtorkalinsky District, Republic of Dagestan, Russia. The population was 1,645 as of 2010. There are 12 streets.

== Geography ==
Ardzhidada is located 69 km northwest of Makhachkala. Krasnoye and Samilakh are the nearest rural localities.
