= Maëlle Gavet =

French businesswoman (born 1978)

Maelle Gavet
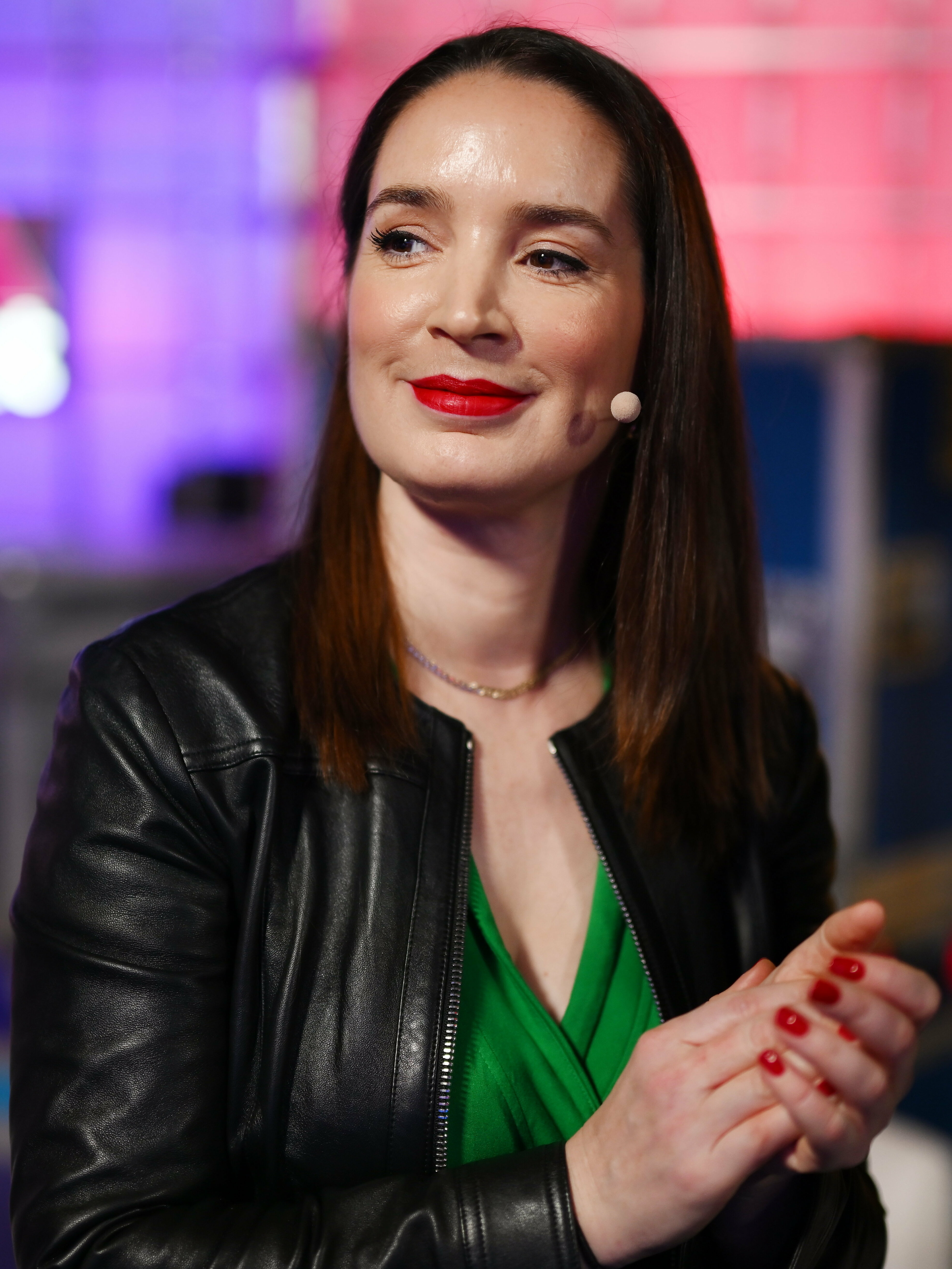
- Gavet in 2022
- Born: May 22, 1978 (age 48); Boulogne-Billancourt, Paris, France
- Known for: Ozon.ru, Priceline, Compass, Inc.
- Board member of: Edenred

Maëlle Gavet (born May 22, 1978) is a French businesswoman, author, and entrepreneur.

== Early life and education ==
Gavet was born in the Paris region of Boulogne-Billancourt, France in a “lower middle class” home. She started her first business organizing children's birthday parties in the Paris suburbs when she was 16. She studied Russian language in school.

She graduated from the Sorbonne in 2000, from the Institut d'Etudes politiques de Paris in 2002, and from the Ecole Normale Superieure de Lettres et Sciences humaines in 2003. Gavet speaks French, Russian and English.

== Career ==
After college, Gavet joined the Boston Consulting Group and worked there from 2003 to 2009. She left there as a principal, having lived in France, UK, India and South Africa.

In 2009, Gavet joined OZON, dubbed as "the Amazon.com of Russia," as Sales and Marketing Director. She was promoted to Chief Executive Officer of OZON Holdings in July 2011. Gavet led the company through two rounds of funding: $100 Million in 2011 and $150 Million in 2024. In February 2012, Gavet led OZON to acquire Sapato.ru, Russia's online shoe and accessory retailer. In May 2014, OZON acquired a stake in the Russian eBook distribution platform, LitRes.ru.

Gavet then joined The Priceline Group in June 2015 as executive vice president of Global Operations.

In January 2017, following the abrupt departure of CEO Darren Houston, Gavet joined Compass, Inc. as COO. In September 2019, Gavet publicly announced she would leave Compass, Inc. in October 2019.

In 2020, Gavet wrote the book, Trampled by Unicorns, about technology and empathy. She was also raising money from investors to buy a technology company.

In January 2021, Gavet became CEO and a board member at Techstars. On May 22nd, 2024, Maëlle Gavet announced her departure from Techstars.

== Reception ==
In 2012, Gavet was included in Forbes' "The World’s Most Powerful Women — Women to Watch" list. She also took 10th place out of 100 in a list of "Most Creative People in Business" by Fast Company and 26th in the 40 under 40 by Fortune.

She has been ranked three times as one of the top 100 French young leaders by Le Figaro and Choiseul 100.

In 2014, she was listed fifth among Times Magazine's List of The Top 25 Female Techpreneurs.

In 2015, she was listed as one of 50 most powerful tech women in Europe by Inspiring 50 and the European Commission.

In 2016, she was recognized as a Young Global Leader by the World Economic Forum.
