= Zamulyanka =

Zamulyanka Замулянка
- Village
- Location within Perm Krai Location within Russia
- Coordinates: 57°54′N 56°16′E
- Country: Russia
- Region: Perm Krai
- District: Permsky District
- Time zone: UTC+5:00

Zamulyanka (Russian: Замулянка) is a rural locality (a village) in Frolovskoye Rural Settlement, Permsky District, Perm Krai, Russia. The population was 181 as of 2010. There are 7 streets.

== Geography ==
Zamulyanka is located 13 km south of Perm (the district's administrative centre) by road. Froly is the nearest rural locality.
