= Alexandrovka, Novousmansky District, Voronezh Oblast =

Alexandrovka Александровка
- Selo
- Location within Voronezh Oblast Location within Russia
- Coordinates: 51°36′N 39°19′E
- Country: Russia
- Region: Voronezh Oblast
- District: Novousmansky District
- Time zone: UTC+3:00

Alexandrovka (Russian: Александровка) is a rural locality (a selo) in Otradnenskoye Rural Settlement, Novousmansky District, Voronezh Oblast, Russia. The population was 550 as of 2010. There are 55 streets.

== Geography ==
Alexandrovka is located 13 km southwest of Novaya Usman (the district's administrative centre) by road. Novonikolsky is the nearest rural locality.
