= Tyube =

Tyube Тюбе
- Urban-type settlement

Other transcription(s)
  - Kumyk: Тёбе
- Interactive map of Tyube
- Location of Tyube Tyube (Republic of Dagestan)
- Coordinates: 43°03′N 47°19′E
- Country: Russia
- Federal subject: Dagestan
- Administrative district: Kumtorkalinsky District
- SettlementSelsoviet: Tyube Settlement

Population (2010 Census)
  - Total: 6,496
  - Estimate (2025): 6,602 (+1.6%)

Administrative status
  - Capital of: Tyube Settlement

Municipal status
  - Municipal district: Kumtorkalinsky Municipal District
  - Urban settlement: Tyube Urban Settlement
  - Capital of: Tyube Urban Settlement
- Time zone: UTC+3 (MSK)
- Postal code: 368085
- OKTMO ID: 82636155051

Tyube population
- 2010 Census: 6,496
- 2002 Census: 6,040
- 1989 Census: 3,059

Tyube (Russian: Тюбе; Kumyk: Тёбе, Töbe) is an urban locality (an urban-type settlement) in Kumtorkalinsky District of the Republic of Dagestan, Russia. As of the 2010 Census, its population was 6,496.

== Administrative and municipal status ==
Within the framework of administrative divisions, the urban-type settlement of Tyube is incorporated within Kumtorkalinsky District as Tyube Settlement (an administrative division of the district). As a municipal division, Tyube Settlement is incorporated within Kumtorkalinsky Municipal District as Tyube Urban Settlement.
