= Nechayevka, Voronezh Oblast =

Nechayevka Нечаевка
- Selo
- Interactive map of Nechayevka
- Location of Nechayevka Nechayevka (Voronezh Oblast)
- Coordinates: 51°37′42″N 39°20′31″E
- Country: Russia
- Federal subject: Voronezh Oblast
- Administrative district: Novousmansky District
- Rural settlementSelsoviet: Usmanskoye 2-ye

Population
  - Estimate (October 2005): 187 )

Municipal status
  - Municipal district: Novousmansky Municipal District
  - Rural settlement: Usmanskoye 2-ye
- Time zone: UTC+3 (MSK)
- Postal code: 396311
- OKTMO ID: 20625492111

Nechayevka (Russian: Нечаевка) is a rural locality (a selo) in Usmanskoye 2-ye Rural Settlement of Novousmansky District of Voronezh Oblast, Russia, located 3.9 kilometers (2.4 mi) west from the district's administrative center Novaya Usman, near the M 4 ( E115) road. Population: 187 (2005 est.).

By the Law of Voronezh Oblast #93-OZ of 27 October 2008, the status of Nechayevka was changed from a settlement to a selo.
