= Khryastovo =

Khryastovo Хрястово
- Village
- Location within Vladimir Oblast Location within Russia
- Coordinates: 56°03′N 40°07′E
- Country: Russia
- Region: Vladimir Oblast
- District: Sobinsky District
- Time zone: UTC+3:00

Khryastovo (Russian: Хрястово) is a rural locality (a village) in Vorshinskoye Rural Settlement, Sobinsky District, Vladimir Oblast, Russia. The population was 74 as of 2010.

== Geography ==
Khryastovo is located 14 km northeast of Sobinka (the district's administrative centre) by road. Afanasyevo is the nearest rural locality.
