= Gross merchandise volume =

Total sales value over a given time period

Gross merchandise volume (alternatively gross merchandise value/GMV or gross merchandise sales/GMS) is a term used in online retailing to indicate a total sales monetary-value (e.g. in U.S. dollars or Euros) for merchandise sold through a particular marketplace over a certain time frame. GMV includes any fees or other deductions which a seller might calculate separately. Site revenue comes from fees and is different from the monetary-value of items sold.

GMV for e-commerce retail companies means the average sale price per item charged to the customer multiplied by the number of items sold. For example, if a company sells 10 books at $100, the GMV is $1,000. This is also considered as "gross revenue". In this case, the business model is based on a retail model, where the company basically purchases the items, maintains inventory (if need be) and finally, sells or delivers the items to customers. It does not tell the net sales as GMV does not include costs involved and returns of products.

== See also ==
- Contribution margin
