= Enem, Adygea =

Enem Энем
- Urban-type settlement

Other transcription(s)
  - Adyghe: Инэм
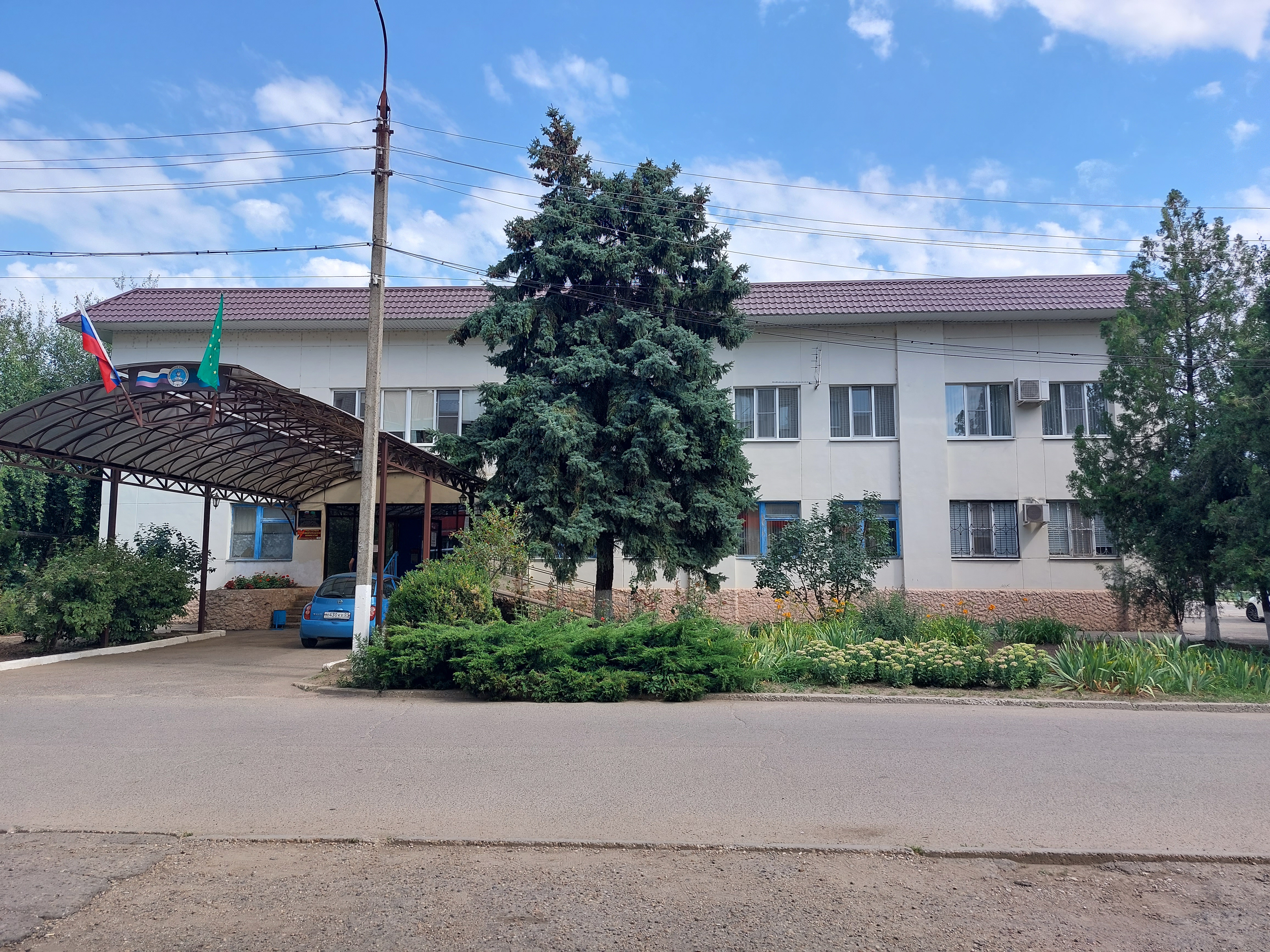
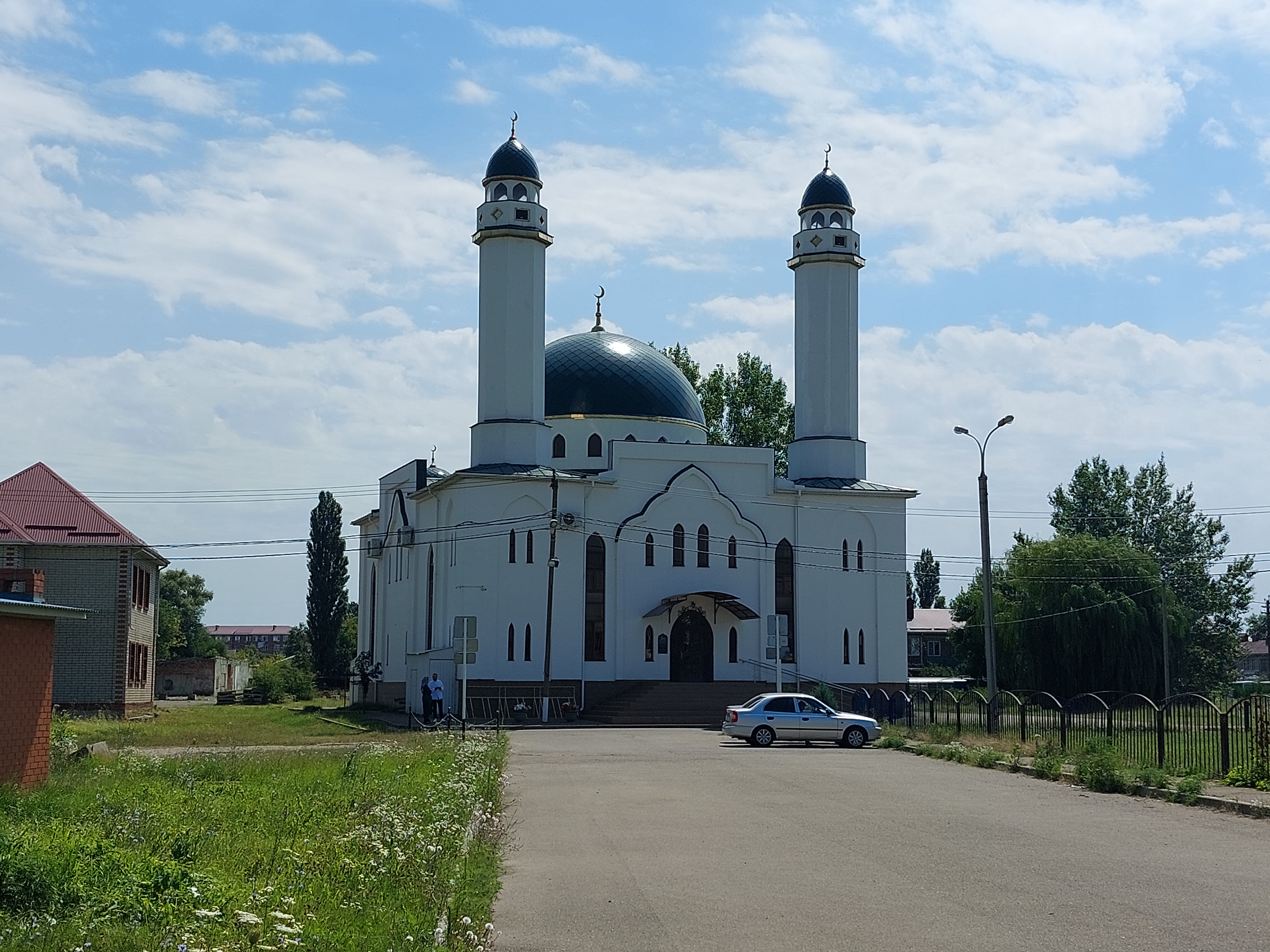
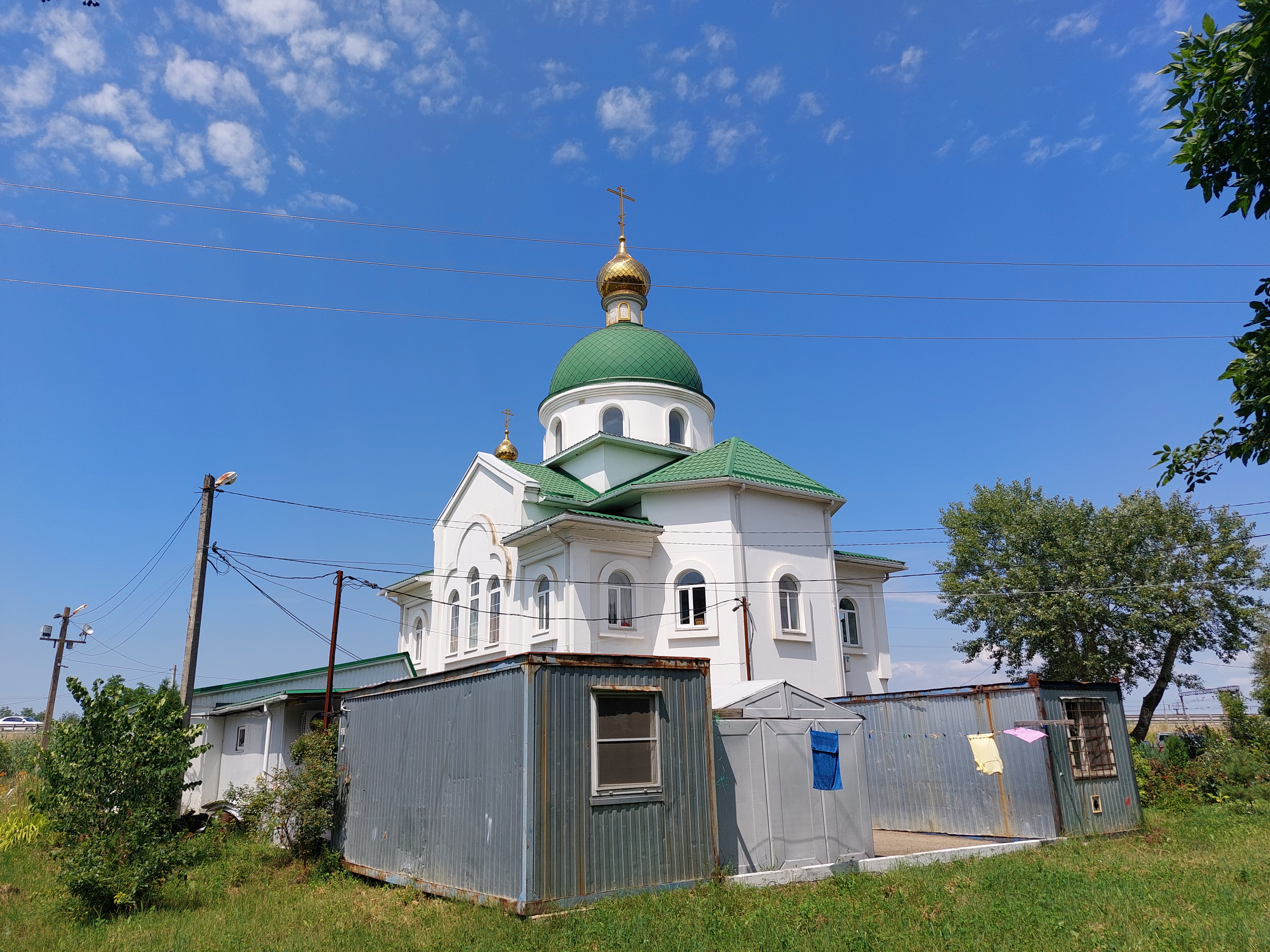
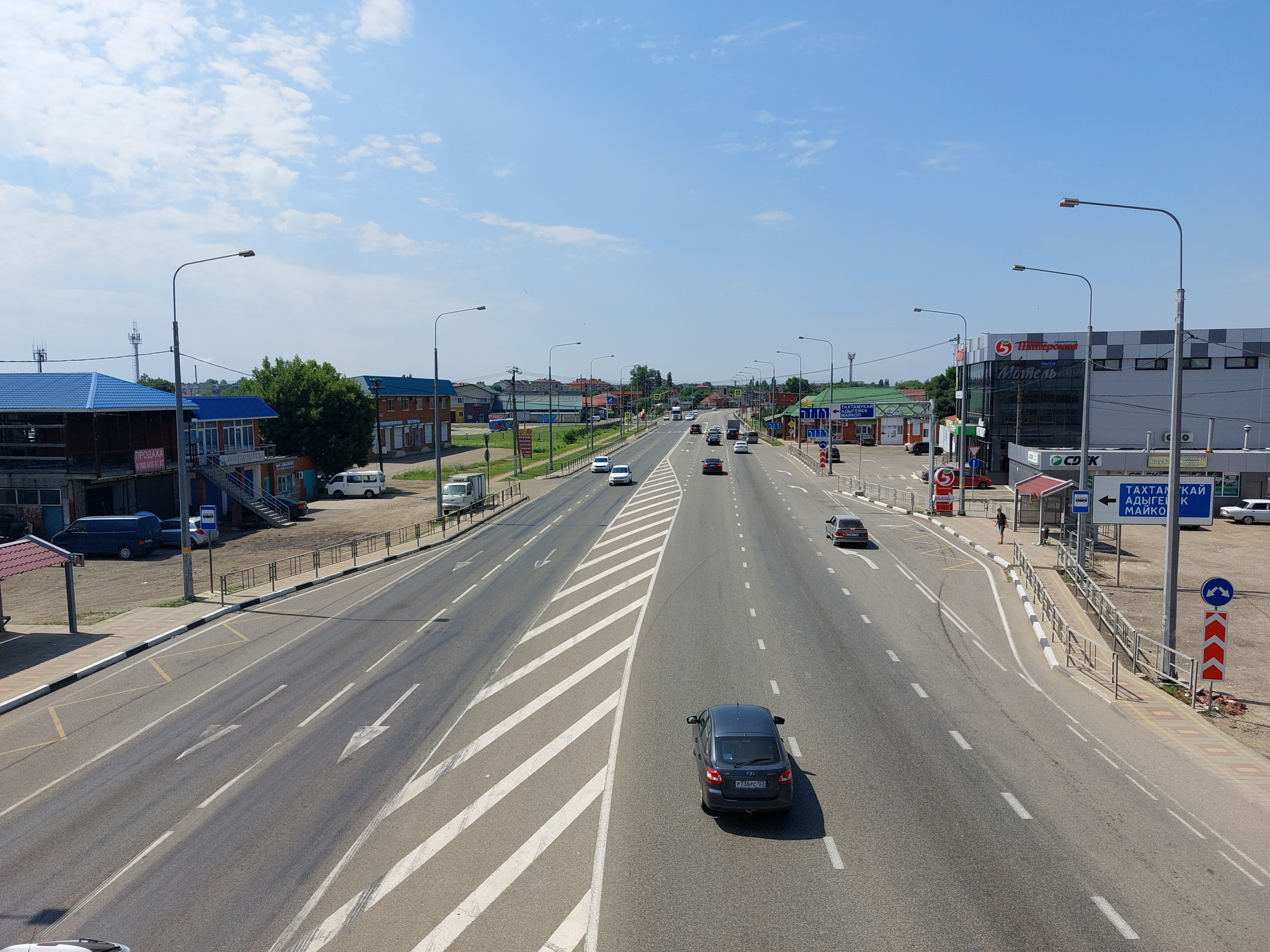

- Coat of arms
- Interactive map of Enem
- Location of Enem Enem (Republic of Adygea)
- Coordinates: 44°56′N 38°55′E
- Country: Russia
- Federal subject: Adygea
- Administrative district: Takhtamukaysky District
- Founded: 1890
- Urban-type settlement status since: November 17, 1967
- Elevation: 24 m (79 ft)

Population (2010 Census)
  - Total: 17,890
  - Estimate (2025): 27,988 (+56.4%)

Municipal status
  - Municipal district: Takhtamukaysky Municipal District
  - Urban settlement: Enemskoye Urban Settlement
  - Capital of: Enemskoye Urban Settlement
- Time zone: UTC+3 (MSK)
- Postal code: 385130–385132
- OKTMO ID: 79630157051

Enem population
- 2010 Census: 17,890
- 2002 Census: 17,654
- 1989 Census: 17,843
- 1979 Census: 11,750

Enem (Russian: Эне́м; Adyghe: Инэм, romanized: Yinem) is an urban locality (an urban-type settlement) in Takhtamukaysky District of the Republic of Adygea, Russia, located on the Krasnodar–Novorossiysk auto route, 245 kilometers (152 mi) northwest of Maykop, the capital of the republic. As of the 2020 Census, its population was 20,372.

== History ==
It was founded in 1890 as a khutor and was granted the work settlement status on November 17, 1967.

== Administrative and municipal status ==
Within the framework of administrative divisions, the urban-type settlement of Enem is subordinated to Takhtamukaysky District. As a municipal division, Enem, together with four rural localities, is incorporated within Takhtamukaysky Municipal District as Enemskoye Urban Settlement.

== Transportation ==
There is an airport and a railway station in Enem.

== Notable people ==
Soviet cosmonaut Anatoly Berezovoy was born in Enem. Russian boxer Vadim Musaev spent his childhood in Enem.
