= Korkmaskala =

Rural locality in Dagestan, Russia

Coordinates: 43°01′21″N 47°17′18″E

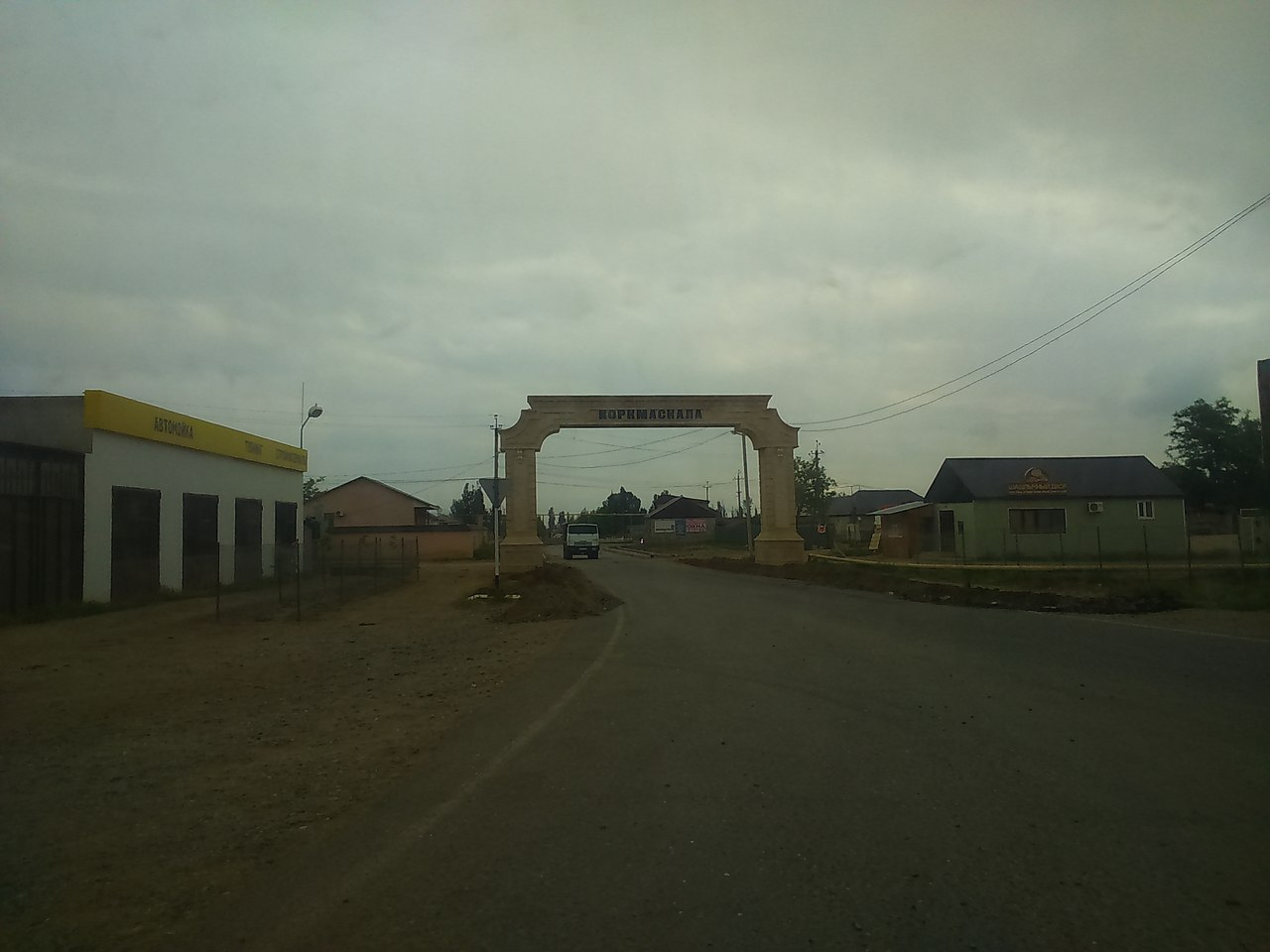
Korkmaskala

Korkmaskala (Russian: Коркмаскала, Kumyk: Торкъали, Torqali or Къоркъмаскъала, Qorqmasqala) is a rural locality (a selo) and the administrative center of Kumtorkalinsky District of the Republic of Dagestan, Russia. Population: 7,722 (2010 census); 5,980 (2002 census);
