= Kumtorkalinsky District =

Kumtorkalinsky District Кумторкалинский район (Russian)
- District

Other transcription(s)
  - Kumyk: Хумторкъали якъ
  - Avar: Хъумторхъала мухъ
  - Dargwa: Кумторкъалала къатI
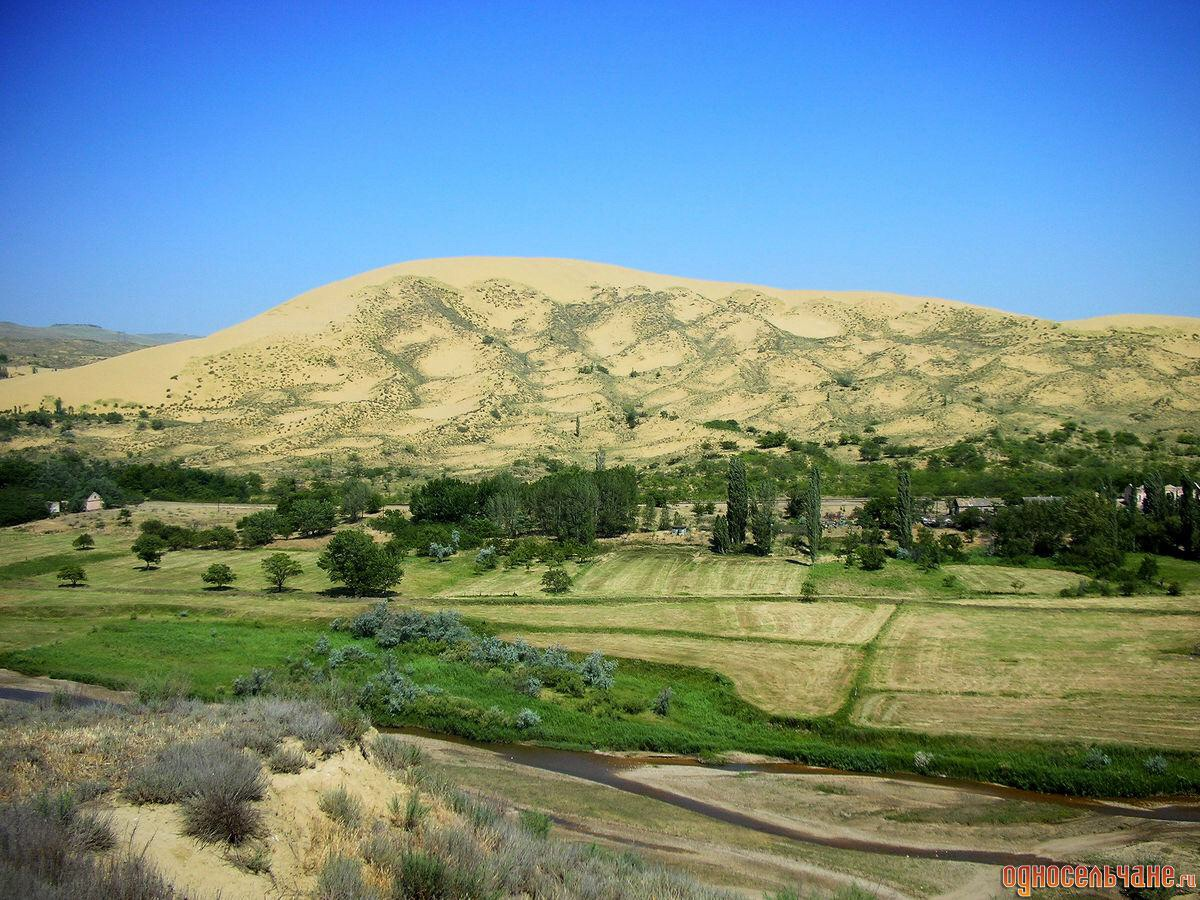
- Sary-Kum Sand Dune, Kumtorkalinsky District

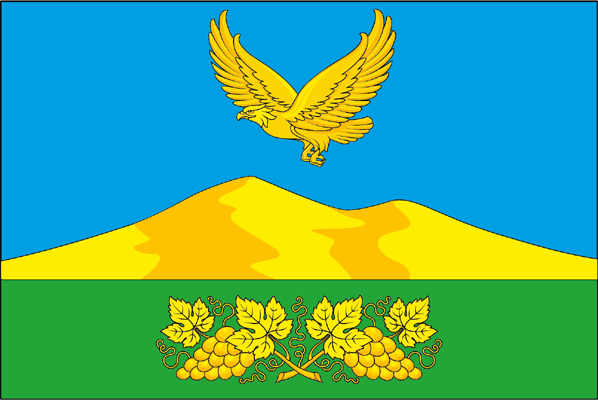
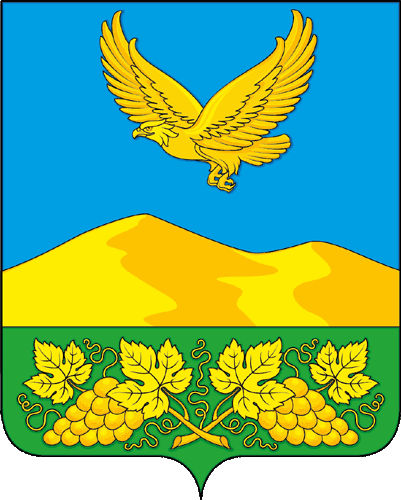
- Flag Coat of arms
- Location of Kumtorkalinsky District in the Republic of Dagestan
- Coordinates: 43°02′N 47°18′E
- Country: Russia
- Federal subject: Republic of Dagestan
- Established: 1920
- Administrative center: Korkmaskala

Area
  - Total: 1,270 km^{2} (490 sq mi)

Population (2010 Census)
  - Total: 24,848
  - Density: 19.6/km^{2} (50.7/sq mi)
  - Urban: 26.1%
  - Rural: 73.9%

Administrative structure
  - Administrative divisions: 1 Settlements, 1 Selsoviets
  - Inhabited localities: 1 urban-type settlements, 7 rural localities

Municipal structure
  - Municipally incorporated as: Kumtorkalinsky Municipal District
  - Municipal divisions: 1 urban settlements, 6 rural settlements
- Time zone: UTC+3 (MSK)
- OKTMO ID: 82636000
- Website: http://мо-кумторкала.рф

Population of Kumtorkalinsky District
- 2010 Census: 24,848
- 2002 Census: 21,053

Kumtorkalinsky District (Russian: Кумторкалинский райо́н, Kumyk: Хумторкъали якъ, Xumtorqali yaq) is an administrative and municipal district (raion), one of the forty-one in the Republic of Dagestan, Russia. It is located in the east of the republic. The area of the district is 1,270 square kilometers (490 sq mi). Its administrative center is the rural locality (a selo) of Korkmaskala. As of the 2010 Census, the total population of the district was 24,848, with the population of Korkmaskala accounting for 31.1% of that number.

== Administrative and municipal status ==
Within the framework of administrative divisions, Kumtorkalinsky District is one of the forty-one in the Republic of Dagestan. It is divided into one settlement (an administrative division with the administrative center in the urban-type settlement (an inhabited locality) of Tyube) and one selsoviet, which comprise seven rural localities. As a municipal division, the district is incorporated as Kumtorkalinsky Municipal District. The settlement is incorporated as an urban settlement, and the selsoviet is incorporated as six rural settlements within the municipal district. The selo of Korkmaskala serves as the administrative center of both the administrative and municipal district.
