= Khotiv =

Rural locality in Kyiv Oblast, Ukraine

Khotiv Хотів
- Village
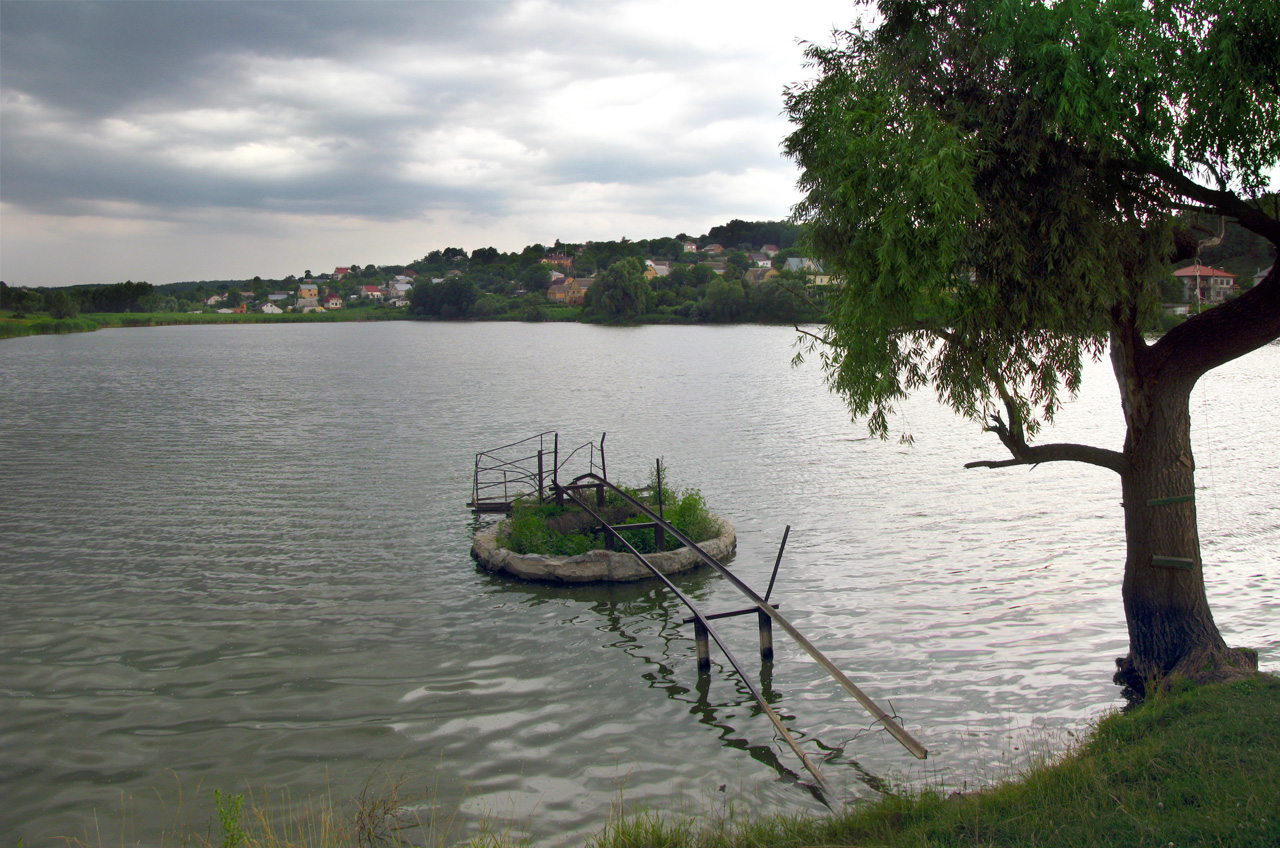
- Pond in Khotiv

- Coat of arms

- Location within Kyiv Oblast Location within Ukraine
- Coordinates: 50°19′49″N 30°28′18″E
- Country: Ukraine
- Oblast: Kyiv Oblast
- Raion: Obukhiv Raion
- Hromada: Feodosiivska rural hromada
- Elevation: 125 m (410 ft)

Population
  - Total: 4,800
- Postal code: 08171

Khotiv is a village in Obukhiv Raion of Kyiv Oblast, Ukraine. It hosts the administration of Feodosiivska rural hromada, one of the hromadas of Ukraine. Khotiv adjoins the boundary of Kyiv in its southwestern outskirts (Feofaniia, Holosiivskyi District). Population of the village is 4800 inhabitants and 1592 houses (01.01.2006). Territory of the Khotiv rural council embraces villages of Kremenyshche (370 inhabitants, 128 houses) and Kruhlyk (330 inhabitants, 110 houses). Total area of this territory is 2432.7 ha. Khotiv occupies 768.7 ha (68 streets), Kremenyshche 121.1 ha (5 streets), Kruhlyk 50.2 ha (6 streets).

The picturesque territory of Khotiv is situated on the side of Kyiv plateau, cut by deep valleys and steep ravines. Khotiv it is divided into two parts by stream Vita (length of 12.6 km). There are two ponds.

Khotiv is the location of the Khotiv hillfort of Scythian times (6 century BC).

Until 18 July 2020, Khotiv belonged to Kyiv-Sviatoshyn Raion. The raion was abolished that day as part of the administrative reform of Ukraine, which reduced the number of raions of Kyiv Oblast to seven. The area of Kyiv-Sviatoshyn Raion was split between Bucha, Fastiv, and Obukhiv raions, with Khotiv being transferred to Obukhiv Raion.

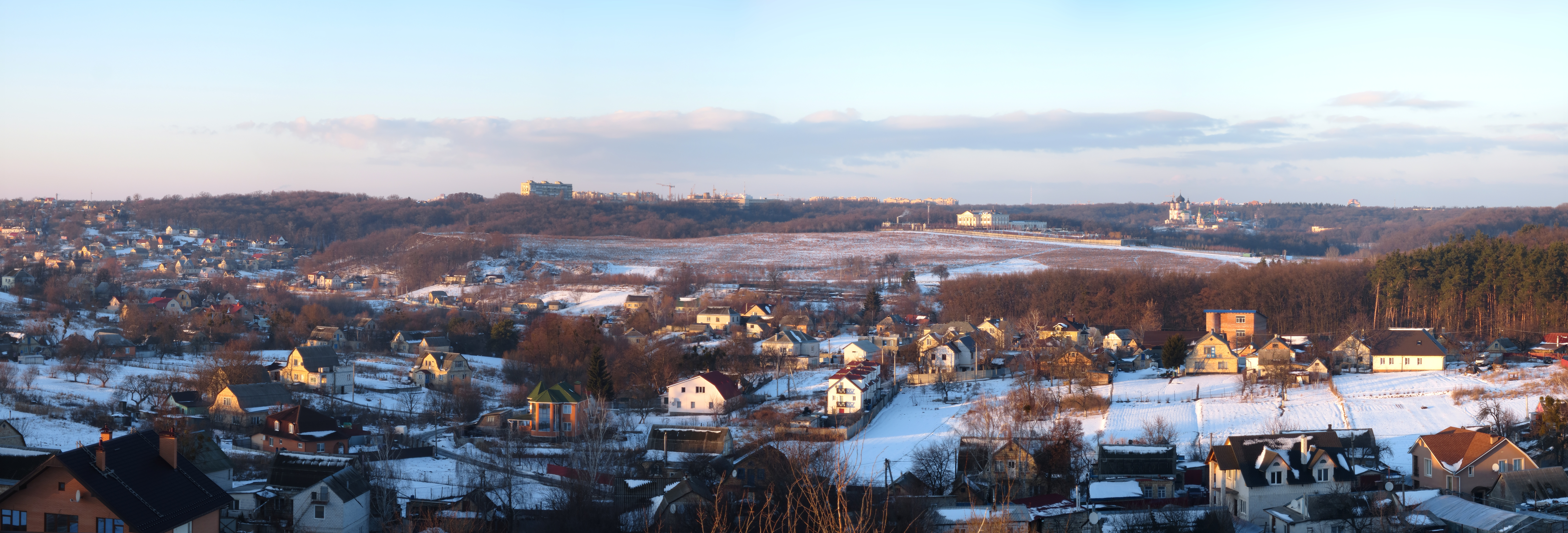
Khotiv from the south. The Khotiv hillfort and St. Panteleimon's Cathedral are seen in the background.
