= Ivakhnenko =

Ivakhnenko (Ukrainian: Івахненко, Russian: Ивахненко) is a Ukrainian surname.

This surname is shared by the following people:

- Alexey Grigorevich Ivakhnenko (1913–2007), Soviet-Ukrainian mathematician
- Valentyna Ivakhnenko (born 1993), Russian tennis player
