= Feodosiivka rural hromada =

Feodosiivka rural hromada Феодосіївська селищна громада
- Hromada
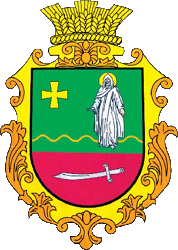
- Seal
- Interactive map of Feodosiivka rural hromada
- Country: Ukraine
- Oblast: Kyiv Oblast
- Raion: Obukhiv Raion

Area
  - Total: 115.0 km^{2} (44.4 sq mi)

Population (2020)
  - Total: 15,200
  - Density: 132/km^{2} (342/sq mi)
- Settlements: 8
- Villages: 8

Feodosiivka rural hromada (Ukrainian: Феодосіївська селищна громада) is a hromada of Ukraine, located in Obukhiv Raion, Kyiv Oblast. Its administrative center is the village of Khodosivka.

It has an area of 115.0 square kilometres (44.4 mi^{2}) and a population of 15,200, as of 2020.

The hromada contains 8 settlements, which are all villages:

- Hvozdiv
- Ivankovychi
- Kremenyshche
- Kruhlyk
- Lisnyky
- Roslavychi
- Khodosivka
- Khotiv

== See also ==
- List of hromadas of Ukraine
