= MESM =

First computer in the Soviet Union

- Also known as: Small Electronic Calculating Machine
- Developer: Sergei Alekseyevich Lebedev; Kiev Institute of Electrotechnology
- Released: 1950; 76 years ago
- Lifespan: 1950–1959
- CPU: 6,000 vacuum tubes @ 5 kHz
- Input: Punched cards or typed using a plug switch
- Power: 25 kW
- Dimensions: 8 to 10 metres (26 to 33 ft) long and about 2 metres (7 ft) tall

MESM (Note: Russian: Малая Электронно-Счетная Машина, МЭСМ, lit. 'Small Electronic Calculating Machine'; Мала Електронна Обчислювальна Машина, MEOM.) was the first universally programmable electronic computer in the Soviet Union. By some authors, it was also depicted as the first one in continental Europe, even though the electromechanical computers Zuse Z4 and the Swedish BARK preceded it.

== Overview ==
MESM was created by a team of scientists under the direction of Sergei Alekseyevich Lebedev from the Kiev Institute of Electrotechnology in the Ukrainian SSR, at Feofaniya (near Kiev).

Initially, MESM was conceived as a layout or model of a Large Electronic Calculating Machine and letter "M" in the title meant "model" (prototype).

Work on the machine was research in nature, in order to experimentally test the principles of constructing universal digital computers. After the first successes and in order to meet the extensive governmental needs of computer technology, it was decided to complete the layout of a full-fledged machine capable of "solving real problems". MESM became operational in 1950. It had about 6,000 vacuum tubes and consumed 25 kW of power. It could perform approximately 3,000 operations per minute.

== Creation and operation history ==
Current view of the building in Feofaniya (current address: Academician Lebedev St., 19), where the MESM was developed.

- Principal computer architecture scheme was ready by the end of 1949. As well as a few schematic diagrams of an individual blocks.
- In 1950 the computer was mounted in a two-story building of the former hostel of a convent in Feofania, where a psychiatric hospital was located before the Second World War.
- November 6, 1950: team performed the first test launch. Test task was:
  $$f(n) = \begin{cases} Y\prime\prime+Y=0 \\ Y(0)=0 \\ Y(\pi)=0 \end{cases}$$
- January 4, 1951: First useful calculations performed: calculate the factorial of a number and raise a number to a power. The computer was shown to a special commission of the USSR State Academy of Sciences. The team was led by Mstislav Keldysh.
- December 25, 1951: Official government testing passed successfully. USSR Academy of Sciences and Mstislav Keldysh began regular operation of the MESM.
- It was operated until 1957, and then transferred to Kyiv Polytechnic Institute for training purposes
- 1959: MESM dismantled. Boris Malinovsky recalled:
  - “Computer was split into pieces, which were used to build a series of stands, after which all of them were thrown away.”

Many of the electron tubes and other components left from MESM are stored in the Foundation for the History and Development of Computer Science and Technology in the Kiev House of Scientists of the National Academy of Sciences of Ukraine.

== System specification ==
- Arithmetic Logic Unit
  - universal
  - parallel action
  - flip-flop based
- Number representation
  - binary
  - fixed points 16-n bits per number plus with one sign bit
- Instructions
  - 20 binary bits per command
    - The first 4 bits - operation code
    - The next 5 bits - first operand address another 5 it the second operand address
    - The last 6 bits - operation result address
    - Following instruction types supported
      - addition
      - add with carry
      - subtraction
      - multiplication
      - division
      - binary shifts
      - comparison taking into account mark
      - absolute value comparison
      - transfer of control
      - magnetic drum read
      - stop
- RAM
  - Flip-flop based
  - Data and code separated
    - 31 machine words for data
    - 63 machine words for code
- ROM
  - 31 machine words for data
  - 63 machine words for code
- Clock rate
  - 5 kHz
- Performance
  - About 3000 operations per minute (total time of one cycle is 17.6 ms; division operation takes from 17.6 to 20.8 ms)

The computer was built using 6000 vacuum tubes, where about 3500 were triodes and 2500 were diodes. The system occupied 60 m^{2} (646 square feet) of space and used about 25 kW of power.

Data was read from punched cards or typed using a plug switch. It could additionally use a magnetic drum that stored up to 5000 codes of numbers or commands.

An electromechanical printer or photo device was used for output.

== See also ==
- History of computing in the Soviet Union
