= Feofaniia =

Historical neighborhood near Kyiv, Ukraine

Feofaniia Teofaniia
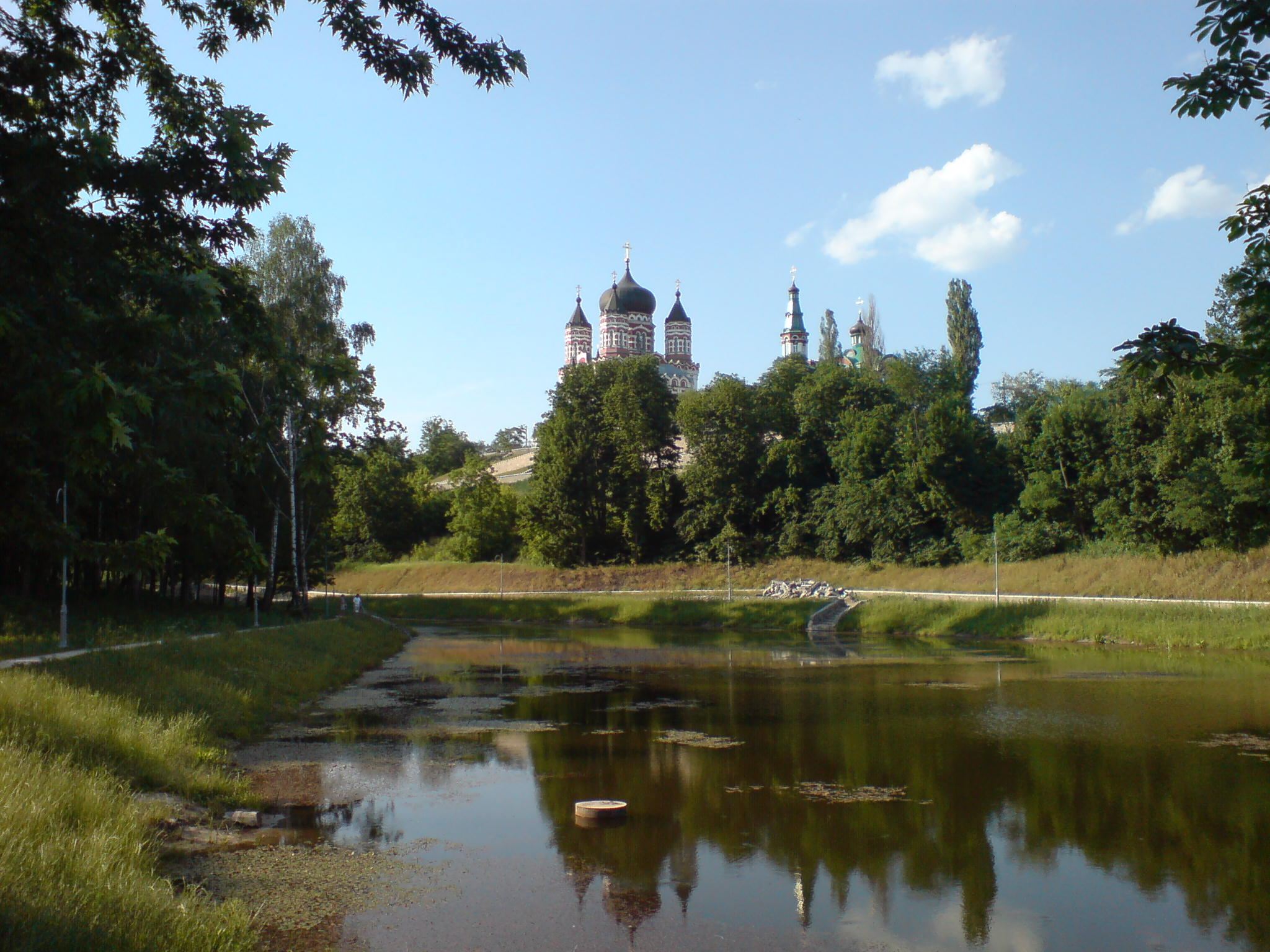
- Feofaniia Park, with St. Panteleimon's Convent in the distance.
- Interactive map of Feofaniia; Teofaniia
- Type: public city park
- Location: Holosiiv Raion
- Nearest city: Kyiv
- Coordinates: 50°20′27″N 30°29′13″E
- Created: 1992
- Founder: government
- Etymology: bishop Theophanes Shyianov-Cherniavskyi
- Operator: National Academy of Sciences of Ukraine
- Status: Monument of Garden Artistry
- IUCN category III (natural monument or feature)
- Website: The Official Site of Feofaniia park

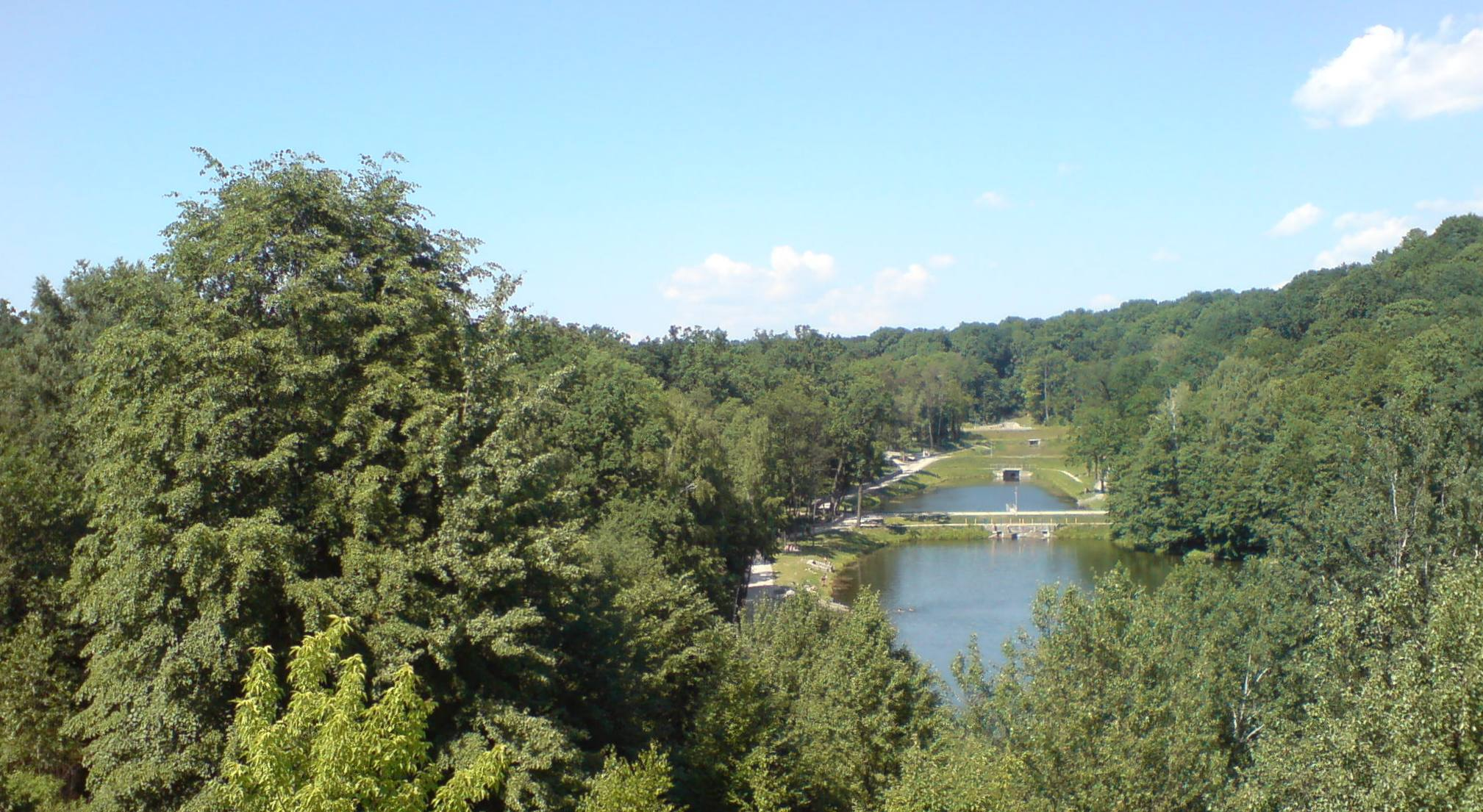
View onto the lower ponds.

Feofaniia or Teofaniia (Ukrainian: Феофáнія, Теофáнія; also called Theophania) is a park located in the historical neighborhood on a tract near the southern outskirts of Kyiv, the capital of Ukraine. The neighborhood is located in the administrative Holosiiv Raion (district) amidst the neighborhoods of Holosiiv, Teremky, Pyrohiv and Khotiv. The park's total area is about 1.5 km^{2} (0.58 mi^{2}). The first Soviet computer, MESM, was built in Feofaniia.

Feofaniia was first mentioned in 1471 as Lazorivshchyna (Лазорівщина), which at the time belonged to an owner named Khodiki. The name is said to derive from a monk named Lazar. In the 17th century, the area was referred to as Shakhravshchyna (Шахравщина).

The modern name Feofaniia dates back to 1803 when Theophanes Shyianov-Cherniavskyi settled in the area, set aside for charity purposes. During the 1860s, Feofaniia belonged to the St. Michael's Golden-Domed Monastery in central Kyiv. Buildings built in the area were constructed in the Ukrainian Baroque style, however, they did not survive. In 1919, Feofaniia was converted to the Soviet state farm, and later transformed into the main observatory for the Institute of Botany of the Ukrainian Academy of Science.

In 1972, Feofaniia was declared a park, and from 1992 — a government designated park, which belongs to the "Feofaniia" conservatory of the National Academy of Science of Ukraine. Reconstruction work began on the area in 2004, which, when finished (projected in 2008) will include new landscaping, water and canal features.

Located near Feofaniia are the St. Panteleimon's Convent, the Nikolay Bogolyubov Institute of Theoretical Physics, and the Government Clinical Hospital "Feofaniia".

== Objects of interests ==
- St. Panteleimon's Cathedral
- Feofaniia Clinic (State Administration of Affairs)
- Feofaniia Park (National Academy of Sciences of Ukraine)
- Boholyubov Institute of Theoretical Physics (National Academy of Sciences of Ukraine)
- Main Astronomical Observatory (National Academy of Sciences of Ukraine)
- Khotiv hillfort of Scythian times (6th century BC)
