= Sergey Lebedev (scientist) =

Soviet computer scientist (1902–1974)

- Сергей Лебедев
- Born: 2 November [O.S. 20 October] 1902; Nizhny Novgorod, Russia
- Died: 3 July 1974 (aged 71); Moscow, Soviet Union
- Education: Bauman Moscow State Technical University
- Known for: MESM; BESM
- Scientific career
- Fields: Electrical engineering, computer science
- Workplaces: National Academy of Sciences of Ukraine; Kiev Electrotechnical Institute; Moscow Institute of Physics and Technology; Institute of Precision Mechanics and Computer Engineering
- Doctoral students: Lev Korolyov

Signature
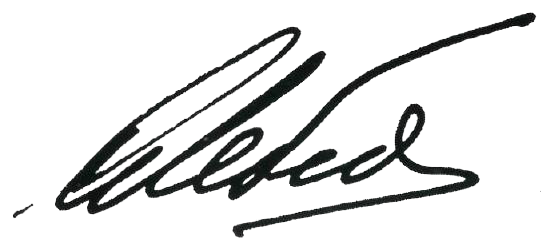

Sergey Alekseyevich Lebedev (Russian: Сергей Алексеевич Лебедев; 2 November 1902 – 3 July 1974) was a Soviet scientist in the fields of electrical engineering and computer science, and designer of the first Soviet computers.

== Biography ==
Lebedev was born on 2 November 1902, in Nizhny Novgorod, Russia. He graduated from Moscow Highest Technical School in 1928. From then until 1946, he worked at All-Union Electrotechnical Institute (formerly a division of MSTU) in Moscow and Kiev. In 1939, he was awarded the degree of Doctor of Sciences for the development of the theory of "artificial stability" of electrical systems.

During World War II, Lebedev worked in the field of control automation of complex systems. His group designed a weapon-aiming stabilization system for tanks and an automatic guidance system for airborne missiles. To perform these tasks Lebedev developed an analog computer system to solve ordinary differential equations.

From 1946 to 1951, Lebedev headed the Kiev Electrotechnical Institute of the Ukrainian Academy of Sciences, working on improving the stability of electrical systems. For this work he received the State Stalin Prize in 1950.

In 1948, Lebedev learned from foreign magazines that scientists in western countries were working on the design of electronic computers, although the details were secret. In the autumn of the same year he decided to focus the work of his laboratory on computer design. Lebedev's first computer, MESM, was fully completed by the end of 1951. In April 1953 the State commission accepted the BESM-1 as operational, but it did not go into series production because of opposition from the Ministry of Machine and Instrument Building, which had developed its own weaker and less reliable machine.

Lebedev then began development of a new, more powerful computer, the M-20, the number denoting its expected processing speed of twenty thousand operations per second. In 1958 the machine was accepted as operational and put into series production. Simultaneously the BESM-2, a development of the BESM-1, went into series production. Though the BESM-2 was slower than the M-20, it was more reliable. It was used to calculate satellite orbits and the trajectory of the first rocket to reach the surface of the Moon. Lebedev and his team developed several more computers, notably the BESM-6, which was in production for 17 years.

In 1952, Lebedev became a professor at the Moscow Institute of Physics and Technology. From 1953 until his death, he was the director of what is now called the Institute of Precision Mechanics and Computer Engineering.

Lebedev died in Moscow and is interred at Novodevichy Cemetery.

== Legacy ==
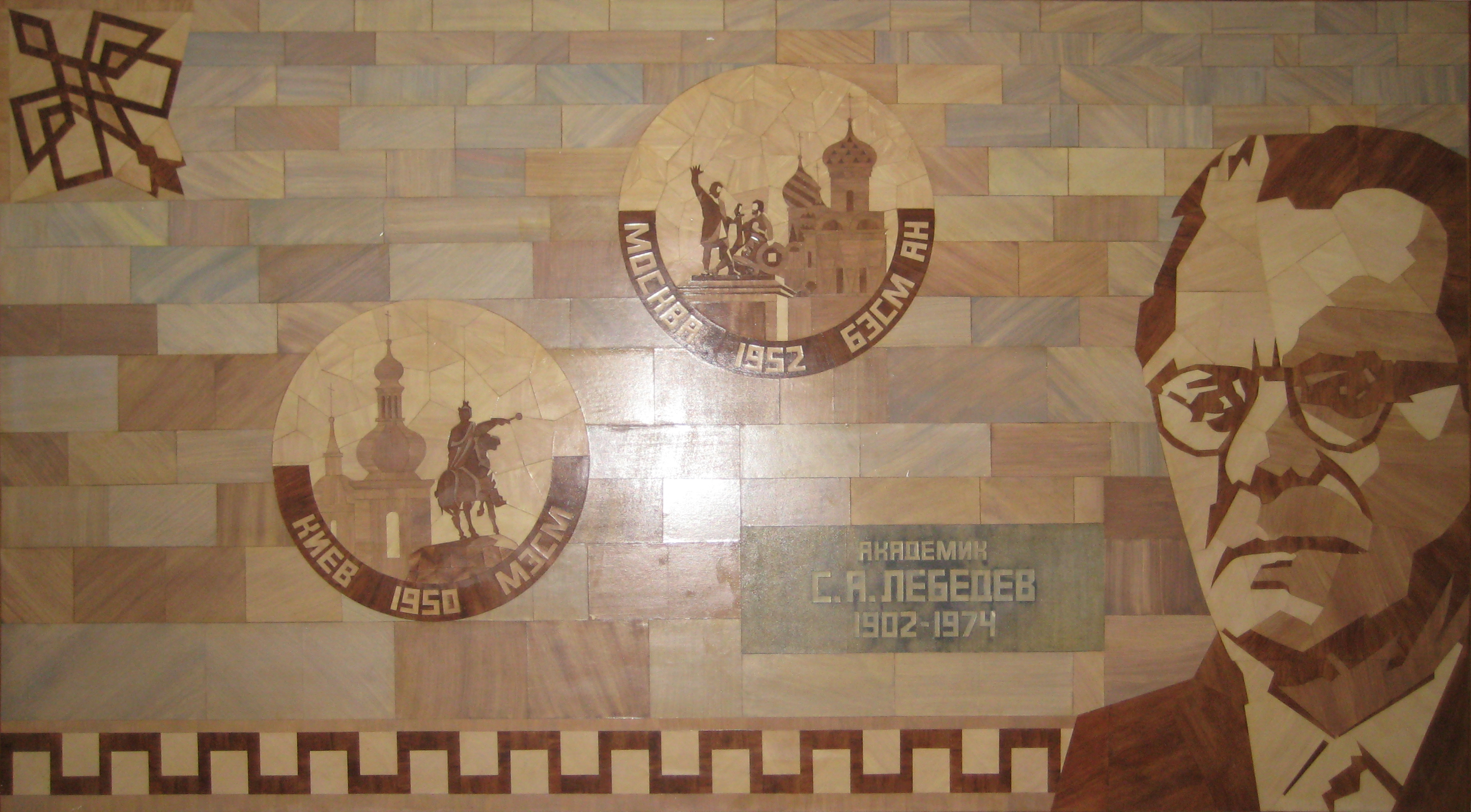
Mosaic with the image of SA Lebedev in Lebedev Institute of Precision Mechanics and Computer Engineering

In 1996, the IEEE Computer Society recognized Sergey Lebedev with a Computer Pioneer Award for his work in the field of computer design and his founding of the Soviet computer industry.

== See also ==
- History of computing hardware
- List of pioneers in computer science
