= NASU Institute of Electrodynamics =

Ukrainian research institute

Coordinates: 50°27′24.26″N 30°26′17.14″E

NASU Institute of Electrodynamics (IED) (Ukrainian: Інститут електродинаміки НАН України, (ІЕД НАНУ), romanized: Instytut elektrodynamiky NAN Ukrainy, (IED NANU)) is a Ukraine leading science institution in field of electrical engineering, thermal power (heat energy), and research of electrodynamics located in Kyiv, Ukraine as a part of the Ukrainian Academy of Sciences. It is well known for the prominent achievements in the field of computer science and electronics, made in early 1950s by Sergei Alekseyevich Lebedev.

The institute was established in 1947 on the basis of electrical engineering department of the NASU Energy Institute as the NASU Institute of Electrical Engineering. In 1963 it was renamed as the NASU Institute of Electrodynamics.

== Notable achievements ==
- MESM, an abbreviation for small electronic calculating system

== Directors ==
- 1947 — 1952 Sergei Lebedev
- 1952 — 1959 Anatoliy Nesterenko
- 1959 — 1973 Oleksandr Milyakh
- 1973 — 2007 Anatoliy Shydlovskyi
- 2007 — Oleksandr Kyrylenko
