= St. Panteleimon's Cathedral =

Cathedral in Ukraine

Coordinates: 50°20′41″N 30°29′16.3″E

- St. Panteleimon's Women's Monastery
- Пантелеймонівський собор
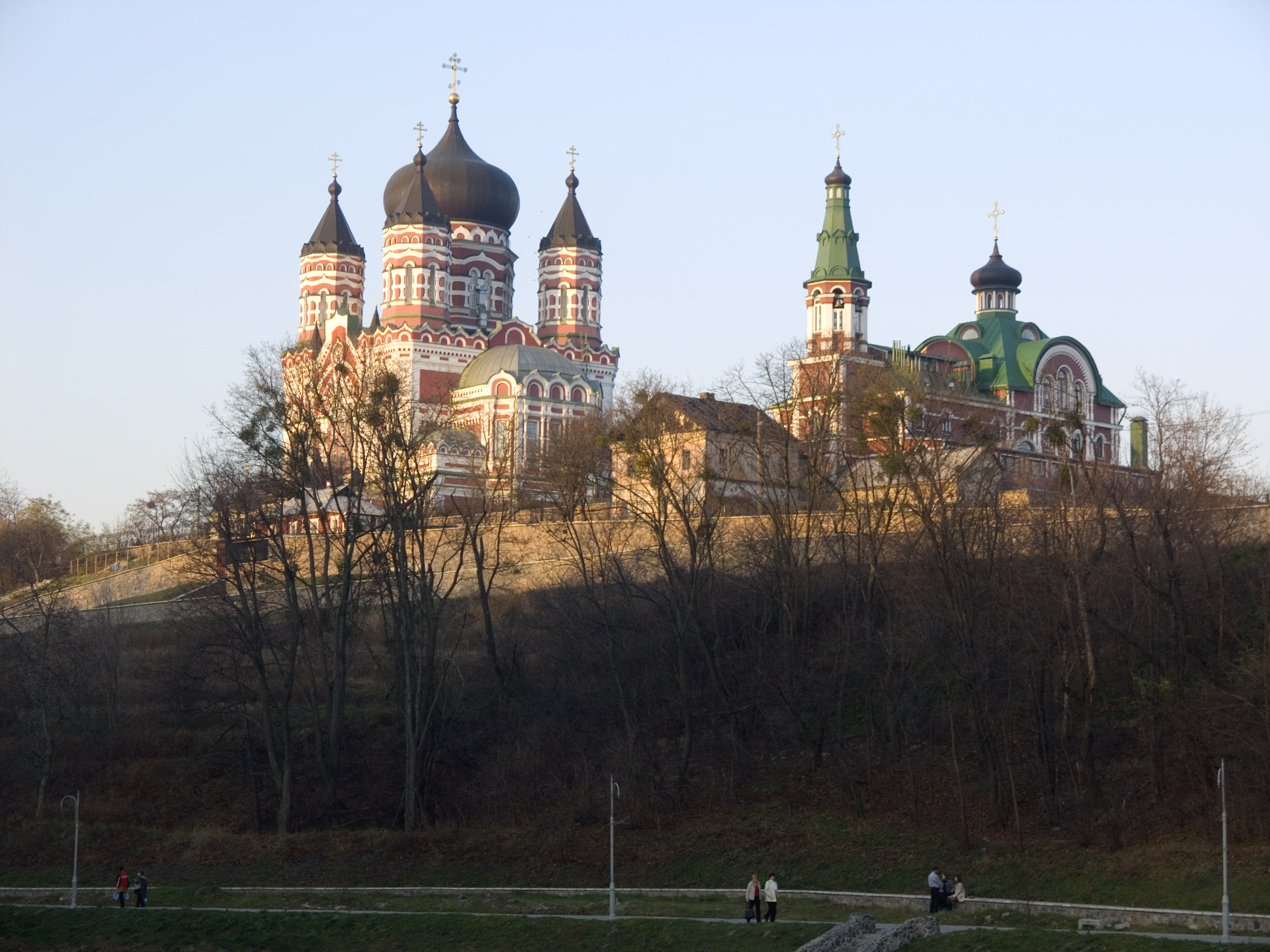
- St. Panteleimon's Cathedral
- Location: Feofaniia, Holosiivskyi District, Kyiv
- Country: Ukraine
- Denomination: Ukrainian Orthodox Church (Moscow Patriarchate)
- Website: https://feofania.church.ua

Architecture
- Architect: Yevhen Yermakov
- Style: Russian Revival
- Years built: 1905–1914

Administration
- Diocese: Kyiv (MP)

Immovable Monument of Local Significance of Ukraine
- Official name: Собор Пантелеймонівський (Cathedral of St. Pantaleon)
- Type: Architecture and Urban Planning
- Reference no.: 436-Кв

The Cathedral of St. Panteleimon (St. Pantaleon) is a large Eastern Orthodox cathedral in the Kyivan neighbourhood of Feofaniia. It shares similarities with the Alexander Nevsky Cathedral, Tallinn and is considered a high point in Russian Revival ecclesiastical architecture.

It was built to a Russian Revival design by Yevhen Yermakov between 1905 and 1912. The building is pentacupolar, with the massive black central dome and the four tent-like domes on the corners, as well as low galleries which run continuously around the building. The outer walls are covered with a mazy web of tracery.

The cathedral was intended to serve as the main church of the Kyivan Monastery of St. Panteleimon, which originated as a branch, or skete, of St. Michael's Golden-Domed Monastery. It was closed for worship and thoroughly looted in the 1920s and damaged in World War II.

The hollow shell of the church was returned to the Ukrainian Orthodox Church in 1990s and has been restored as the main church of a nunnery. The other church building of the convent conforms to the cathedral in style.

== Gallery ==
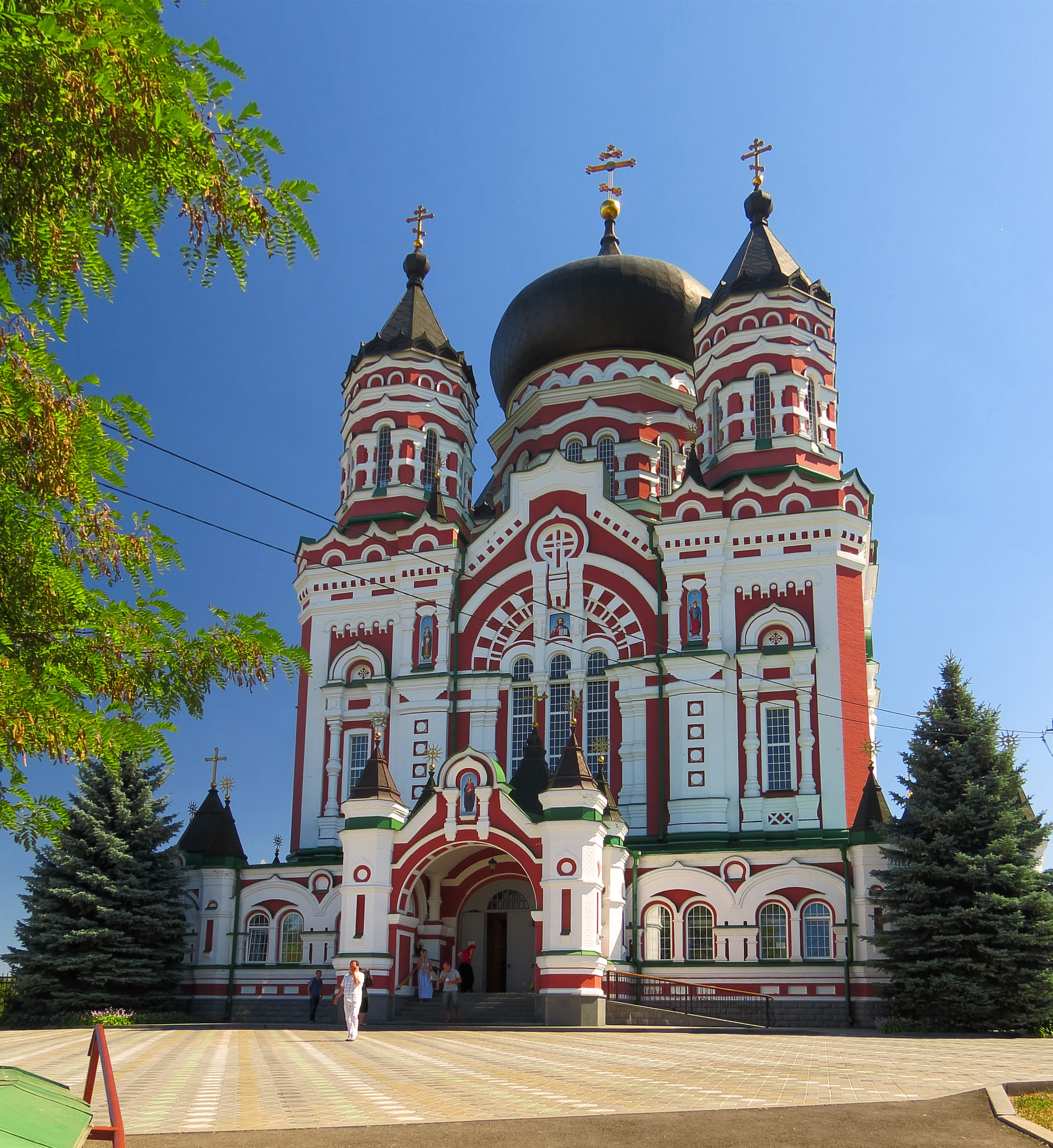
St. Panteleimon's Cathedral

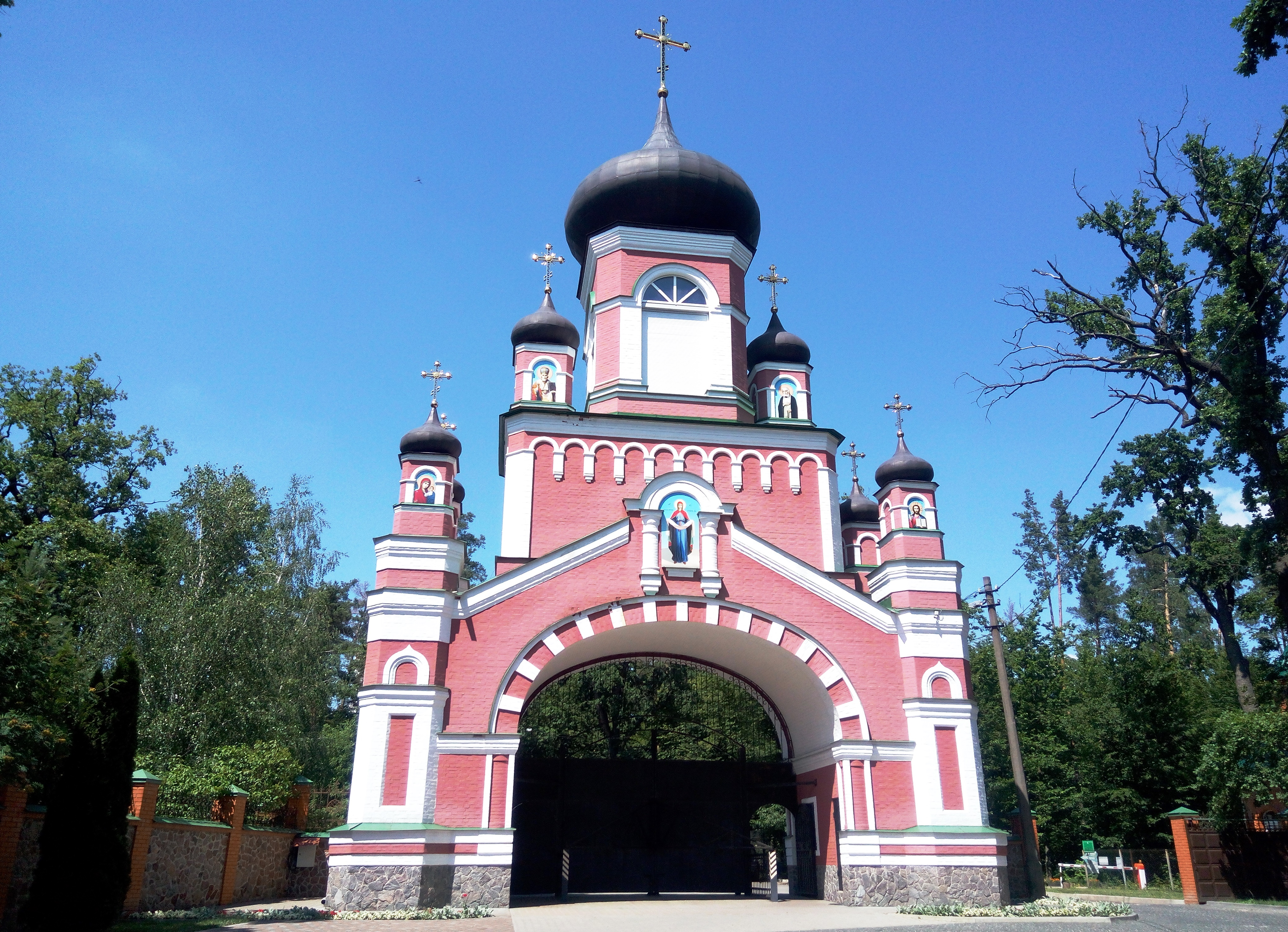
Entrance gates

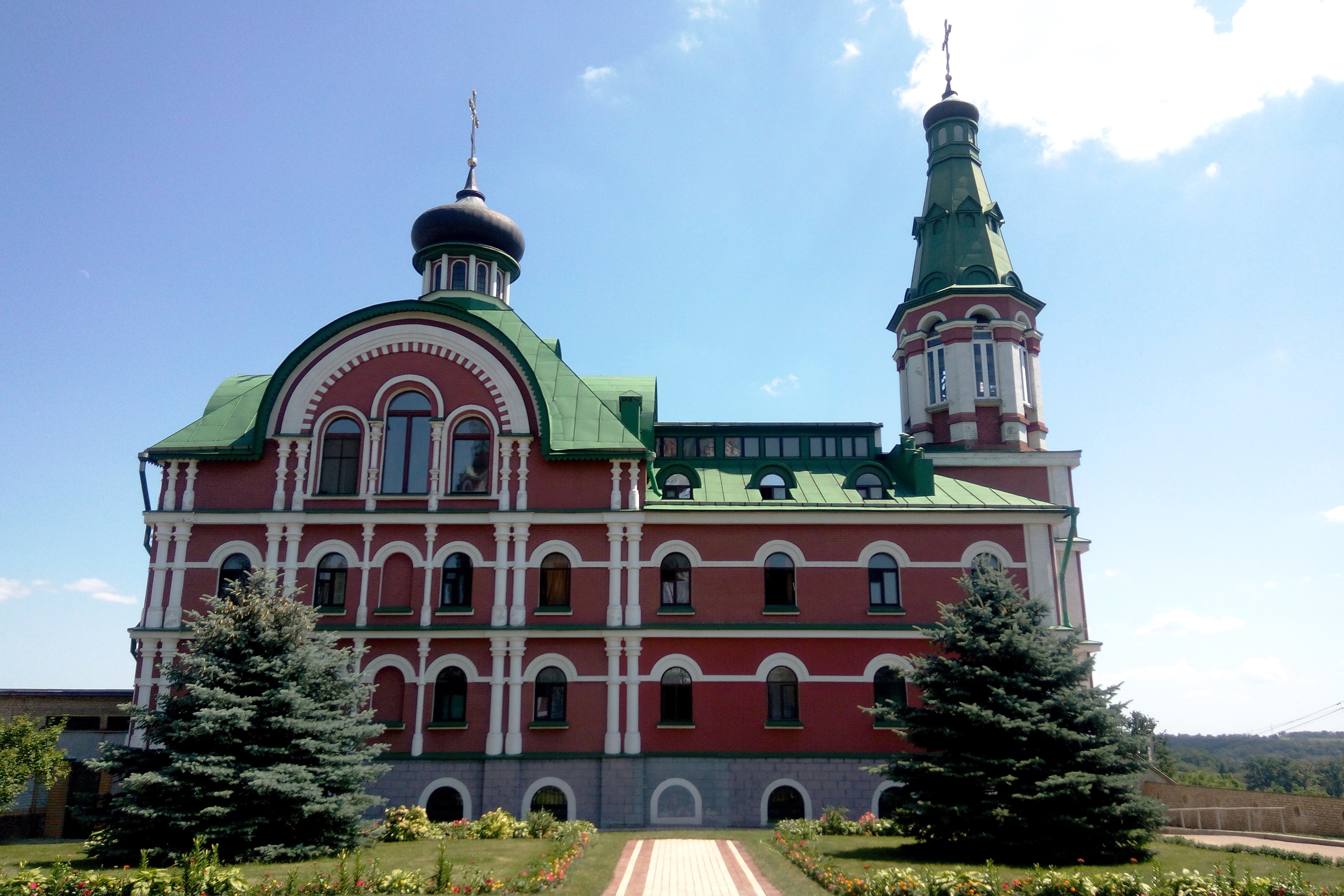
Lesser church of the Monastery

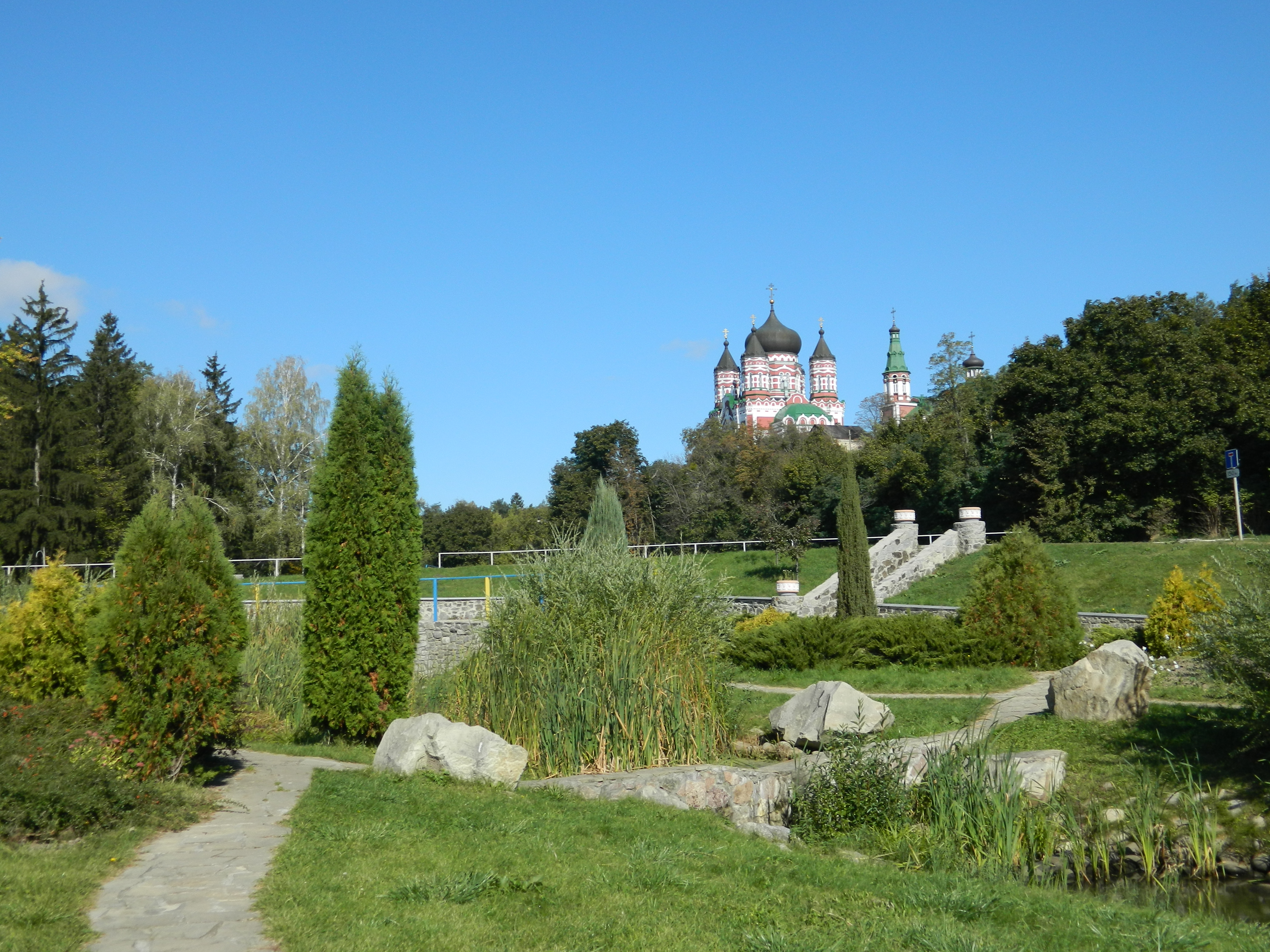
View from Feofaniia Park
