= Experimental data =

Data produced through experimental methods

Experimental data in science and engineering is data produced by a measurement, test method, experimental design or quasi-experimental design. In clinical research any data produced are the result of a clinical trial. Experimental data may be qualitative or quantitative, each being appropriate for different investigations.

Generally speaking, qualitative data are considered more descriptive and can be subjective in comparison to having a continuous measurement scale that produces numbers. Whereas quantitative data are gathered in a manner that is normally experimentally repeatable, qualitative information is usually more closely related to phenomenal meaning and is, therefore, subject to interpretation by individual observers.

Experimental data can be reproduced by a variety of different investigators and mathematical analysis may be performed on these data.

== See also ==
- Accuracy and precision
- Computer science
- Data analysis
- Empiricism
- Epistemology
- Informatics (academic field)
- Knowledge
- Philosophy of information
- Philosophy of science
- Qualitative research
- Quantitative research
- Scientific method
- Statistics
