= Bookmate =

Social ebook subscription service

- Company type: Private
- Website type: Social Software
- Available in: English, Serbian, Spanish, Russian, Estonian, Turkish, Swedish, Ukrainian, Danish
- Headquarters: {{{location_country}}}
- Area served: Worldwide
- Owner: Bookmate Limited
- Services: Social reading and publishing platform
- Website: bookmate.com

Bookmate is a social ebook subscription service, available primarily on mobile, with catalogues in 9 languages. The mobile app is supported on iOS, Android, Windows Phone and feature phones, and the service is also available in a web version.

== History ==
Bookmate was created in 2007 by three former employees of the Russian edition of Look At Me - programmers Andrei Zotov and Egor Khmelev and designer Kirill Ten. In its first version, Bookmate was an aggregator and search engine for bookstores, offering the user the best price. In 2009, the creators relaunched it as a book reading app with search as one of its functions. By 2010, Bookmate had a library of classic literature, contracts with publishers for electronic releases of contemporary works, and a paid subscription to a book club with social mechanics.

In 2010, Dream Industries (DI), which also included the Russian streaming service Zvooq and the educational resource Theories and Practices, became a co-owner of Bookmate. After DI ceased to exist in 2017, Bookmate's head office moved to Ireland.

Starting with $500,000 seed funding, Bookmate raised funds in two subsequent funding rounds. In June 2011, the company received $3 million from Ulmart and Essedel, and in May 2014, it received a further $3 million from Ulmart.

As of 2013, Bookmate provided access to more than 255,000 books. By March 2014, it became the largest distributor of ebooks in Russia, with 1 million registered users.

In April 2014, Bookmate received the Publishing for Digital Minds Innovation Award at the London Book Fair. In October the same year, it launched its mobile app for Android and iOS users.

In August 2015, Indonesian telco Indosat has announced a partnership with Bookmate to launch a mass-market mobile reading service under the Bookmate-Cipika Books brand.

A regional office of Bookmate in Mexico City began operating in 2017 and continued to expand from there to countries such as Argentina, Colombia, Chile, Peru, and other Spanish-speaking nations.

In August 2022, the Irish company Bookmate Limited gave Yandex a license to use the technological platform of the service in the CIS and Russia. Bookmate Limited left the Russian market.

In October 2022 the Irish company Bookmate Limited, which owns the Bookmate book service, was included in the Register of Foreign Agents in Russia. The company’s CEO Andrew Baev was also added to the list of “foreign agents”. Bookmate Limited owned majority stakes in two book publishers, Individuum and Popcorn Books (both profitable), which it had to sell due to political risks. In an interview with Meduza, Andrew Baev said that Russia has never been the main market for Bookmate, and the company continues to work in the Balkans, Latin America, and Europe.

As of November 2022, Andrew Baev was the company's CEO and Simon Dunlop served as the Executive Chairman of the Board.

As of February 2023, Bookmate has 10 million registered users, and a catalogue of over 1,000,000 books.

== Features ==
Bookmate enables unlimited reading of its catalogue for a fixed monthly fee. In the app readers can follow the feeds and bookshelves of friends.

Bookmate has a built-in recommendation system that consists of two different stages. Primarily, the user is prompted to select the genres of books that they like during the onboarding in the app. The selection of recommended books is furtherly adapted to users’ tastes and preferences based on their reading activity in the app.

== Content ==
As of December 2014, Bookmate offered titles in 9 different languages and had a catalogue of over 500,000 books.

In Bookmate apps and on the website, a catalog of books, audiobooks and comic books can be browsed or searched for via various parameters, such as name, author, genre etc. The catalog contains both free (public domain) content and the content distributed by subscription. The availability of the content for certain users is determined based on this user’s location and the characteristics of this user’s subscription.

As of early 2023, Bookmate has a catalog of 50,000 free books, millions of works available for subscription, and audiobooks in 19 languages.

The company produces original content in Latin America, and in the Balkans under the Bookmate Originals brand.

In addition, Bookmate Journal is published online in Denmark and Serbia.

== Partnerships ==
Bookmate partners with mobile operators and original equipment manufacturers such as Indosat in Indonesia, StarHub in Singapore, Kcell in Kazakhstan, Azercell in Azerbaijan and Tigo in Latin America for preinstalls and carrier billing on mobile phones and other mobile devices.

Bookmate works with a large number of publishers and content aggregators around the world, including Egmont, Macmillan, Gardners, Bookwire, PublishDrive, Gyldendal, Libranda, Bloomsbury, Findaway, Laguna, Parkstone International and others.
