= Baturin (surname) =

Baturin (masculine, Russian: Батурин) or Baturina (feminine, Russian: Батурина) is a Russian and Croatian surname. Notable people with the surname include:

- Ekaterina Baturina (gymnast) (born 1997), Russian artistic gymnast
- Ekaterina Baturina (luger) (born 1992), Russian luger
- Viktor Baturin (born 1956), Russian businessman, producer, brother of Yelena
- Yelena Baturina (born 1963), Russian billionaire businesswoman
- Yuri Baturin (born 1949), Russian cosmonaut

Others

- Martin Baturina (born 2003), Croatian football player
- Mate Baturina (born 1973), Croatian football player
- Nikolai Baturin (1936–2019), Estonian novelist and playwright
- Roko Baturina (born 2000), Croatian football player
