= DNK (brand) =

Russian clothing brand

DNK Russia
- Company type: private company
- Industry: Clothes production
- Founder: Anna Alekseeva, Olga Kovalenko
- Headquarters: Rostov on Don, Russia
- Area served: Russia
- Website: dnk-russia.com

DNK Russia — is a Russian designer brand of family clothing and accessories production, founded by sisters Anna Alekseeva and Olga Kovalenko (both before marriages — Nichkova).

== Activity ==
In 2015, Anna Nichkova and Olga Nichkova began sewing baby clothes for their own newborn children according to their sketches. On summer of 2015, the first batch of children's clothing was sold using Instagram.

In 2016, a warehouse for clothes was opened. A year later, the sisters signed a contract with a sewing company, but the received batch turned out to be defective. This incident was the reason for the opening of there sewing workshop. In the fall of 2017, the official website of the company was launched.

In 2018, they attracted the attention of the public with a project when models, children, singers, artists, star children, people with disabilities came to the same podium at the Moscow Fashion Week show.

In 2020, as part of the #myplace campaign, 2 thousand hygienic masks were sewn for volunteers and the elderly people.

On October 3, filming of the Cinema Fashion project "Another Reality" took place, where a show of various clothing brands was presented, including DNK.

And also DNK is an eco-friendly brand. They abandoned polyethylene for packaging, replacing it with a convenient and practical alternative — a shopping bag. And they continue to develop new packaging for deliveries that will meet all environmental requirements

=== Name ===
In 2015, when selling the first batch, the brand was named D&N Kids, since the Dom & Nica trademark was registered to Anna's husband. Later, the brand was renamed DNK Kids, then DNK Russia, as it is today.

=== Impressions ===
- Moscow Fashion Week — SS2020, SS2019
- Fashion Week in Belarus — AW2018
- Crimean Fashion Week 2018
- Caspian Fashion Week 2018

=== Awards ===
- 2017 — Kids Fashion Awards in the category "Breakthrough of the Year"
- 2019 — Kids Fashion Awards
- 2020 — the Book of Records of Russia in the category "The largest number of children who demonstrated clothes of one brand on video in Russia".
- 2020 — record holder Instagram 2020 in the nomination of the most successful "Russian top bloggers".
- 2021 — the book of records of Russia in the category "The largest number of participants in the fashion show of one brand (online)"

=== Advertising campaigns ===
- 500 raincoats for the program "Heads and tails" on TV channel "Friday!"
- 30 sets of the collection "Alice in Wonderland", "Hippie" with Simona Yunusova
- children's clothing together with Black Star and Anastasia Reshetova
- collection of sweatshirts with images of Soviet cartoon characters from Soyuzmultfilm and Smeshariki
- DNK&AlexSparrow By Alexey Vorobyov
- Instagram promotion by Marie Kraymbreri, Velvet Musiс and Natalia Zubareva
- merch for Love Radio

== Products ==
At launch, only children's clothing was created: overalls, "kids" and hats. By the end of 2015, children's T-shirts and hoodies were added. In 2017, the range includes children's tracksuits. In October 2017, a trial batch of dresses for daughters and mothers was released. Then clothes for the whole family began to be created. In 2021, the collection "DNK&SMESHARIKI" was created, which consists of T-shirts, sweatshirts, trousers, leggings and suits. The line is designed not only for children and teenagers, but also for adults.

== Implementation ==
- Stores
  - Russia: Rostov-on-Don.
- Online platforms:
  - Official website
  - Wildberries
  - Instagram
