= Baturin (disambiguation) =

Baturin or Baturyn may refer to:

- Baturyn (Батурин), a historic town in northern Ukraine
  - Sack of Baturyn in 1708
- Baturyn, Edmonton, a residential neighbourhood in Alberta, Canada
- Baturin (surname)
