= Wildberries =

Largest Russian online retailer

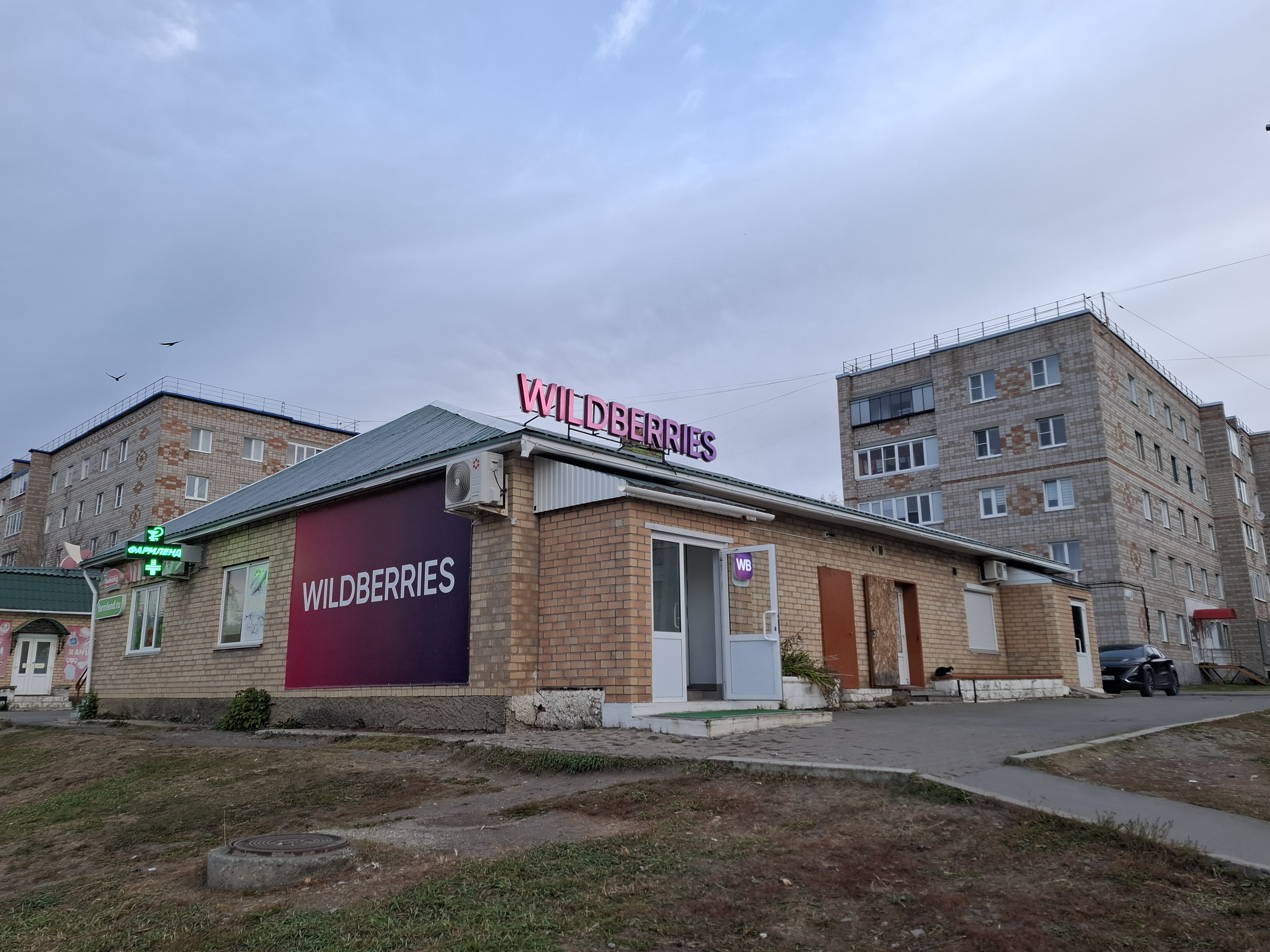
- Location in Bashkortostan
- Industry: E-commerce
- Founded: 2004
- Headquarters: Moscow, Russia
- Key people: Tatyana Kim
- Revenue: $7.11 billion (2024)
- Operating income: $26.7 million (2017)
- Net income: $398,052 (2024)
- Total assets: $3.88 billion (31 December 2024)
- Total equity: $29.1 million (2017)
- Website: wildberries.ru

Wildberries is the largest Russian online retailer. It was founded in 2004 by Tatyana Kim. Besides Russia, Wildberries serves the United Arab Emirates, and former Soviet republics Armenia, Azerbaijan, Belarus, Georgia, Kazakhstan, Kyrgyzstan, Uzbekistan and Tajikistan. Until 2022, the company had services in France, Germany, Israel, Italy, Moldova, Poland, Slovakia, Spain, Turkey, Ukraine and the United States.

Wildberries sells 37,000 brands of clothing, shoes, cosmetics, household products, children's goods, electronics, bookrs, jewelry, food, and much more. With 48,000 employees as of 2020, Wildberries processes an average of 750,000 online orders per day. Wildberries has been refrered to as "Russia's Amazon".

== History ==
The company was founded in 2004 by Tatyana Kim, who started the business at the age of 28 in her Moscow apartment while on maternity leave from teaching. She realized how difficult it was for her and other young mothers to shop for clothes for themselves with a newborn at home. Her husband, Vladislav Bakalchuk, an IT technician, soon joined her to help build the business.

In 2017, Wildberries became Russia's largest online retailer, surpassing Ulmart. The company, originally based in Milkovo, Moscow Oblast, relocated to Moscow in 2018.

In 2018, Wildberries attracted 2 million daily visitors and chalked up $1.9 billion in sales. By 2019, revenues had grown to $3 billion with net profit increasing from Rbs1.88bn to Rbs7bn, confirming Wildberries’ leading role in Russia's fast-growing $30bn ecommerce market. Forbes included Kim on the list "The 10 Most Notable New Billionaires of 2019", with a net worth of approximately $1 billion.

In January 2020, Wildberries started operating in the European Union with the launch of sales in Poland. It planned to open about 100 order distribution units in Poland and opened the first in Warsaw. The platform was officially blocked and subjected to sanctions in Poland in April 2022, and in February 2025, the entity was removed altogether from the Polish official business register.

The company managed to expand in the aftermath of the 2008 financial crisis, as foreign companies sought to offload their excess inventory at a steep discount.

During the COVID-19 pandemic in 2020, the company reported a doubling of sales to $6 billion, of which $305 million was to overseas markets.

In February 2021, Kim bought Standard Credit, a small Russian bank with capital of 302 million rubles for an undisclosed sum. Its role was for settlement with suppliers and fulfilling consumer services. In August 2021, the bank was rebranded as Wildberries Bank. In January 2022, Wildberries Bank started withdrawing prepaid virtual bank's "WB-cards" with a digital wallet.

In April 2021, Wildberries launched an online store in the United States.

From June 2021, Wildberries has allowed online sales by installment and on credit in Russia.

In July 2021, Ukraine imposed sanctions on Wildberries and Kim because they sold Russian military uniforms and anti-Ukrainian books. The company said it did not have assets in Ukraine or capital, so sanctions would not harm Wildberries, but only Ukrainian entrepreneurs using its platform. Wildberries said that it sold goods that other foreign players sold in Ukraine. Wildberries accused Ukraine of double standards and discrimination against business. Wildberries did not expect harm to the company.

In February 2022, the company launched a 5 billion-ruble subsidy program to encourage sellers to quickly deliver product to the Wildberries warehouse, discounting merchant fees paid to the company for each hour they were ahead of the average delivery time.

In April 2022, as a result of the Russo-Ukrainian war, Kim and Wildberries were added to Poland's sanctions list for indirect support of the war; it was noted that the company "is the largest taxpayer in the Russian Federation".

In the summer of 2022, the company became a kit manufacturer for various Russian Premier League clubs, such as FC Spartak, PFC CSKA and FC Zenit.

In July 2023, Wildberries announced the launch of travel services on its platform. Users are offered package tours, as well as booking hotels and hostels, both in Russia and abroad. At the time of the launch of the service, the company sold only offers from travel agencies and aggregators.

On 13 January 2024, a fire broke out at the company's 70,000 m² warehouse in the village of Shushary near St. Petersburg (coordinates: 59°47′01″N 30°26′44″E). Extinguishing the fire took 30 hours. According to preliminary estimates, the amount of damage from the fire was approximately 11 billion rubles. The warehouse had operated without permission from the Russian State Construction Supervision Inspectorate (Gosstroynadzor) and had never been visited by the fire inspectorate.

=== Russ merger ===
In June 2024, Wildberries announced a merger with the outdoor advertising firm Russ Group to build a digital market and a payments platform. The merger was completed by October. Kim's husband Vladislav Bakalchuk (the couple were in the process of getting divorced) called the deal a hostile takeover and claims that Tatyana was being manipulated.

Vladislav was unexpectedly supported by the head of Chechnya, Ramzan Kadyrov. He also called the deal a hostile takeover and the owners of Russ Group swindlers. He accused the head of Russ Group, Robert Mirzoyan, and his brother Levan of not allowing Kim to communicate with her family and promised: "not to stand aside." In August 2024 as a result of the merger, RVB LLC was created. The head of the new company was Russ Group CEO Robert Mirzoyan.

In October 2025, Wildberries & Russ acquired a state-owned stake in the Uzbek postal operator UzPost.

In November 2025, Wildberries-Russ announced expansion into the African market after finalizing a deal with the state-owned Ethiopian Investment Holdings.

=== Shootout ===
On 18 September 2024, a group of armed men led by Vladislav Bakalchuk tried to enter the company's headquarters in Moscow, leading to a shootout that left two people dead. Bakalchuk was briefly arrested on a murder charge, that was subsequently dropped.

=== Ukrainian drone attacks ===
On 18 July 2026, Ukraine began a series of attacks on Wildberries facilities. That night, Ukrainian drones destroyed the Wildberries warehouse in Elektrostal and another in Kotovsk, which resulted in the deaths of nine people and 62 injured. On 20 July, a massive 400-drone raid hit the Moscow region's logistics network and fuel sites, including Wildberries facilities. By 22 July, Ukrainian drones hit the online giant's warehouses for a second time, striking two major logistics hubs. On 23 July, two more warehouses were burned in continued attacks. After a month of drone strikes, the Ukrainian Defense Ministry stated that seven of its ten main logistics hubs had been struck. In total, 20 facilities were struck. Ukraine justified the strikes by arguing that the Russian military used Wildberries to supply itself, including drone components and navigation equipment. The Russian government denied the claim, while Robert Brovdi, the commander of Ukraine's Unmanned Systems Forces, stated that the strikes were intended to make ordinary Russians directly feel the consequences of the war. According to Mark Galeotti: "These are not military and high-value political targets, therefore they're not especially secured, they're not really built to be able to shrug off drone strikes."
