= Yelena Baturina =

Russian billionaire (born 1963)

- Елена Батурина
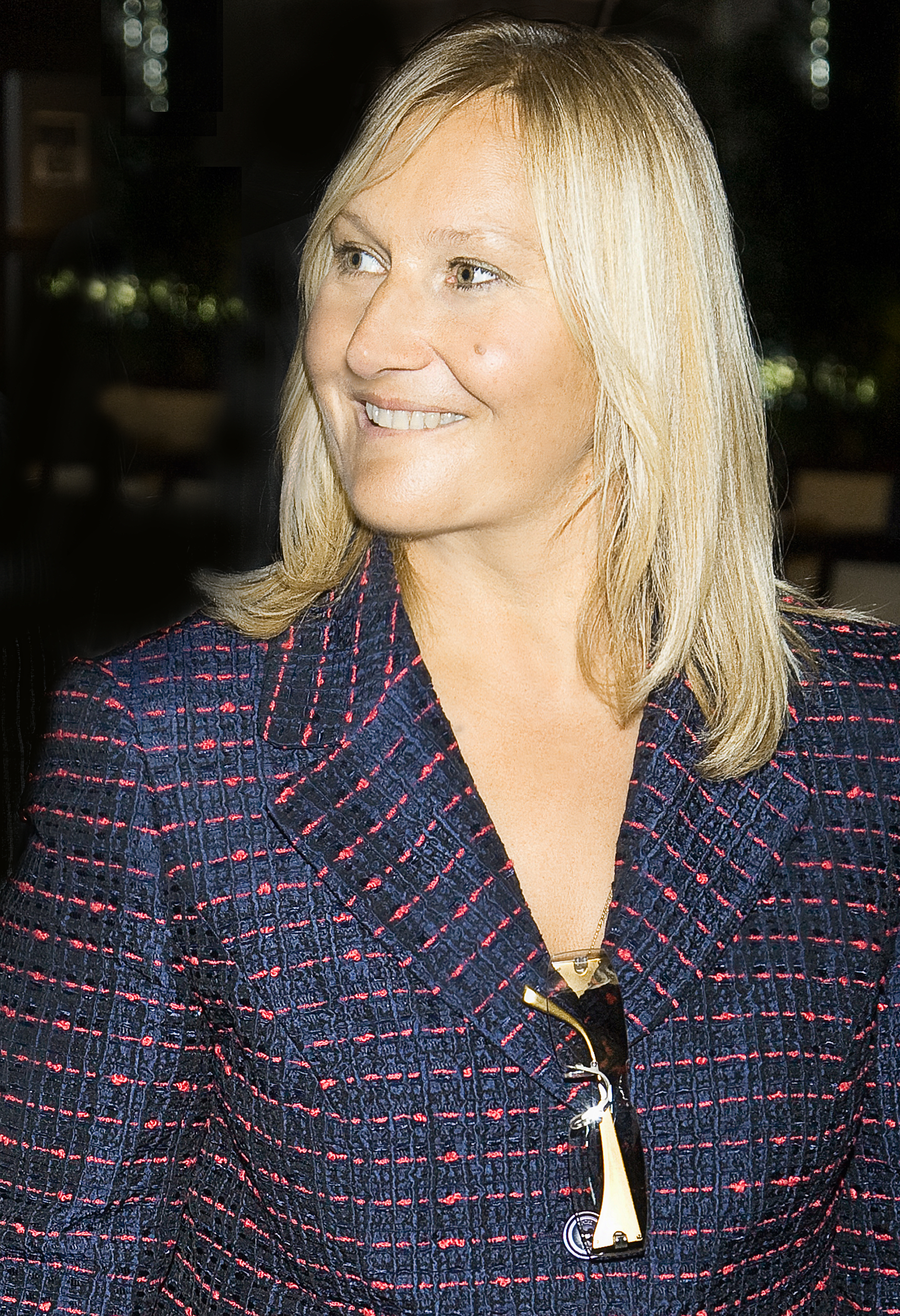
- Baturina in 2013
- Born: Yelena Nikolayevna Baturina; 8 March 1963 (age 63); Moscow, Russian RSFR, Soviet Union (now Russia)
- Occupations: Founder of Inteco and Be Open
- Spouse: Yury Luzhkov (m. 1991; died 2019)
- Children: 2
- Relatives: Viktor Baturin (brother)

Yelena Nikolayevna Baturina (Russian: Елена Николаевна Батурина; born 8 March 1963) is an international billionaire businesswoman and a philanthropist of Russian origin. She is based in Austria. She was married to Yury Luzhkov, mayor of Moscow (from 1992 to 2010), until his death in 2019.

In 1991, she founded Inteco, an investment and construction company. According to Forbes, with a fortune of $1.2 billion, she was the richest woman in Russia, until Tatyana Bakalchuk overtook her spot in February 2020 with $1.4 billion.

As of 2025, Baturina ranks 2,479th on the Forbes Billionaires List with a net worth of $1.3 billion. Her sources of wealth are listed as “investments, real estate, self-made.” She holds the 100th position among Russian billionaires and ranks 4th among the wealthiest women in Russia.

== Biography ==
Baturina is a Moscow native who began working as a design-technician at the Frezer industrial tool plant (where her parents worked) after graduating from high school.

- 1980–1982: the Frazer plant, technician-designer, then senior design engineer of the Chief Technologist Department;
- 1982–1989: Institute of Integrated Economic Development of Moscow, researcher; Russian Union of United Cooperatives, head of the Secretariat; the Mosgorispolkom Commission on cooperative activity, senior specialist.
- since 1989 engaged in private business activities;
- 1991–1994: LLP "Inteco", director;
- 1994–2011: CJSC "Inteco", president;
- 2006–2011: deputy head of the interdepartmental working group on the priority national project "Affordable and Comfortable Housing to Russian citizens", a member of the commission on the development of affordable housing under the President of the Russian Federation on the implementation of priority national projects and demographic policy.

Baturina met her future husband, Yury Luzhkov, in 1987 when they were both serving at Mosgorispolkom, a Soviet-era municipal commission. At the period of their co-working the relationships were purely professional. In one of her interviews Baturina remembers: "We never even thought about anything like that when we were working together, it all happened much later". Baturina and Luzhkov married in 1991. The next year, he became mayor of Moscow. In 2010, he was dismissed by President Dmitry Medvedev amidst still unproven accusations of corruption and mismanagement voiced on state run television.

After her husband's dismissal, Baturina moved to London. She explains the choice of the city by the fact that her two daughters decided to study in London

In November 2010, Luzhkov gave an interview to the Telegraph newspaper stating that the couple was sending their daughters to study in London to protect them from possible persecution from the Russian authorities. He also said that a house had been rented in the west of the city for them and that he and his wife intend to visit them regularly. Luzhkov also claimed that the Russian authorities were planning to break up Baturina's business empire and that the couple would fight the attempt: "We will not give up. My wife will battle for her business and for her honour and self-worth. That is for sure".

In September 2009, The Sunday Times erroneously stated that Witanhurst, a large house in Highgate, North London, had been bought by Baturina, via an offshore front company. Baturina sued the papers owners, Times Newspapers, a subsidiary of News International. Times Newspapers apologized for the story and paid damages to her in October 2011.

== Career ==
=== Inteco ===
In 1989, Baturina launched her first enterprise with her elder brother Victor, primarily dealing with computer software and hardware. In 1991 Baturina founded her company, Inteco ("Inteko" (Интеко) in Russian), which focused on construction though it began as a plastics business. In 1994, Inteco purchased a plastic factory. In 1998, the company won the contract for producing 85,000 seats for Luzhniki Stadium, Moscow's largest stadium. The critics claimed that the decision was affected by Luzhkov as Mayor of Moscow, though Inteco stated that their price was 50% less than their nearest competitor's.

In the middle of 1990s, Inteco entered the construction business focusing on development of advanced materials and technologies for facade work, cement, brick and poured concrete construction, architectural design and real estate business.

In 2001, Inteco acquired from a private person the controlling stake in one of the leading housebuilding factories in Moscow DSK-3. Following modernization the construction plant provided 500,000 square meters of housing per year. This acquisition, according to Baturina's interviews, became the starting point for the company's major construction activity. "DSK-3 is my first real step into construction. I had been viewing the market for a long time. I saw how quickly and dynamically it was developing, how many opportunities it was offering. Still the deal took place sort of accidentally. The lawyers of the former main owner's widow came to me and said that some unfriendly entities were questioning her property rights and trying to simply rob her of her stake. And the frightened woman had decided to sell all the shares to Inteco on the condition that we defend her rights in court. We have successfully managed that and just like that, almost by accident, became the owners of the plant."

At one point, Inteco was said to control 20% of construction in the capital. However, according to experts, quoted by media, from 2000 to 2010 of construction activities Inteco's share in the state order was no more than 2%. While the main contractors for the implementation of the Moscow government orders were construction companies MFS-6 (24.5%) Glavmosstroy (20.7%), SU-155 (13.7%) and MSM-5 (12.2%). In 2002, Inteco created a subsidiary "Strategy Construction Company", whose main objective was the construction of monolithic buildings. Such cement plants as "Podgorensky cementnik" and "Oskolcement", one of the largest cement producers in the central Russia, were also bought at that time.

In 2005, Inteco sold its cement works for estimated US$800 000 to Eurocement Group in order to consolidate financial and administrative recourses that the company needed for the implementation of perspective construction programs.

In 2006, Baturina was appointed Deputy Head for the inter-ministerial group under the national project "Affordable and Comfortable Housing for Russian citizens".

Shortly afterwards, Inteco sold DSK-3, a producer of prefabricated buildings, as well and fully concentrated on the construction of monolithic housing and commercial real estate.

Part of the proceeds from the sale of these assets were directed by Baturina to buying some high-yield "blue chips" of the largest Russian companies such as Gazprom and Sberbank. This step allowed the visionary businesswoman to later sell the shares in the crisis year of 2009 at a significant profit and return Inteco's earlier business development bank loans ahead of schedule, which allowed to keep the businesses afloat. The interest rate on loans at that time sprang up from 10.8 to 18 percent, which led to the ruin of a significant number of Russian developers.

At the same time, as part of a new cement project, Inteco purchased Verkhnebakansky Cement Plant and the Atakaytsement cement factory located in the Krasnodar region.

As of 2007, the company owned such entities as Inteko Plast (55%), Bistro Plast (50%), construction firms SK DSK-3 (100%), Styre (100%), Inteco CENTER (100%), Inteco Chess (Elista, 100%), Intekostroy (70%). The company also owned enterprises in the city of Sochi - Park (100%), The Matrix (100%), Sochi AO (75.58%), Horizont (50%), Selectioner (Belgorod region., 100%) and Uspensky Agromashplast (Moscow reg., Uspensky, 38%). Inteco Group also included Russian Zemelny Bank and trading house Moscow River involved in the supply of grain.

In 2007, the company's revenue, according to its own data, amounted to $1 billion.

At the end of 2008, along with Gazprom and Russian Railways, Inteco was included into the list of 295 strategic enterprises of the country.

In 2009, the company begins cooperating with an outstanding Spanish architect Ricardo Bofill as part of the programme aimed at creating fundamentally new systems for mass housing in Russia.

In 2010, Inteco launched the construction of the second academic building for the Moscow State University named after Lomonosov.

In 2010, Baturina was named one of the largest taxpayers in Russia, the taxes to the state budget for 2009 amounted to 4 billion rubles. As of 2009, 99% of the company is owned by Baturina, 1% is on the balance sheet of the Company itself. The project development portfolio is more than 7,000,000 square meters, the cement capacities exceed 0.6 million tons per year.

At the end of 2010, Baturina sold its Russian Zemelny Bank (RZB) to foreign investors.

The most significant completed projects of Inteco in Moscow (in the period of company Baturina's ownership) are: the residential quarter "Shuvalov" (270,000 square meters), the residential quarter "Grand Park" (400,000 square meters), the residential site "Volga" (400,000 square meters), the multifunctional complex "Fusion Park" with the "Autoville" - museum of unique cars from private collections (100,000 square meters), the Fundamental Library (60,000 square feet), and the academic building for Humanities (100,000 square meters) of the Moscow State University.

After her husband's resignation, Baturina started selling her assets in Russia. The best offer was filed by Mikail Shishkhanov and Sberbank Investments. They bought the 95% and 5% shares of Inteco correspondingly. The exact amount of the transaction was never disclosed, but the report of Sberbank stated that according to the experts that participated in the preparation of the deal, the market value of Inteco, its projects and structures was around 1.2 billion dollars. The deal did not include the cement plants of Inteco. One of them was later sold to Lev Kvetnoy for estimated 17 billion rubles.

=== Hotel business ===
The first development in the new hotel chain was the five-star Grand Tirolia Golf & Ski Resort, located in the Grand Tirolia Golf & Ski Resort in Kitzbühel, Austria. In 2009, the hotel achieved honorary status as the "Home of Laureus" awards in Austria, and became the official venue for the annual ceremony. In 2018, the hotel was sold to an Austrian investor.

In 2010, Baturina opened the New Peterhof Hotel in Saint Petersburg, which received a number of architectural awards. In 2012, following reconstruction work, Baturina opened the Quisisana Palace in Karlovy Vary, Czech Republic. The hotel is a member of the Small Luxury Hotels of the World association. Three years later, Baturina opened the Morrison Hotel in Dublin, Ireland, which she purchased in 2012 for €22 million. It was sold in 2022 to Zetland Capital for €65 million.

=== Development business ===
In late 2015, Baturina opened an office in New York to oversee her US$10 million investment into commercial buildings she acquired in central Brooklyn, and look into the prospects of developing a construction project.

In November 2016, Baturina's structures launched a construction and development project in Europe. Her company acquired a land plot on the coastline of Limassol, Cyprus. The construction of high-end apartment building Symbol Residence was launched in 2019 and was completed in 2021.

=== Membrane Construction ===
In autumn 2015, Baturina's structures became a strategic investor of Hightex GmbH, a global membrane construction company based in Rimsting, Germany.

=== Renewable energy ===
Since 2014, Baturina's Investment Group has been developing a project to generate, use and market renewable energy in Europe. In 2018, Baturina's enterprise has launched the first ESCO (Energy Services Company) project in Cyprus.

=== Allegations of criminal links ===
According to leaked diplomatic cables, the US ambassador to Russia, John Beyrle, alleged that Baturina had links to major criminal groups, particularly Solntsevskaya Bratva.

=== Philanthropy ===
Baturina has been involved in local and international charities since 1990s. The main focus of her charitable projects is transforming the world and society for the better, based on the principles of sustainability, design-thinking, and investing into the creative mind power of the next generation.

Since 2012, the BE OPEN Foundation has been the vehicle for Elena Baturina’s international philanthropic work. Registered in Switzerland, BE OPEN is a cultural and social initiative that aims to connect established experts with emerging talent through conferences, competitions, exhibitions, master classes, and art events.

For two years, Baturina was a Trustee to the Board of the Mayor's Fund for London.

== BE OPEN Foundation ==
BE OPEN is a cultural and social initiative set up in 2012, and funded by Yelena Baturina with the “aim to harness the brainpower of creative leaders through a system of conferences, competitions, exhibitions, master classes and art events.”

The foundation was launched at Milan Design Week 2012. Working in collaboration with leading design publication Interni, the foundation had significant presence at the Fuori Salone.

BE OPEN revisited Milan Design Week in 2013 with a multi-sensory experience, with a focus on synaesthesia. The event explored the overlap between colour and taste, smell and sight represented in the House of the Senses and was designed by French architect Christophe Pillet. BE OPEN again revisited Milan Design week in 2015 for the Garden of Wonders exposition dedicated to redesigning defunct perfume brands.

In 2014, with support from the Government and ministries of India, BE OPEN created an important exhibition of works by promising local designers in Delhi to encourage artisans to explore alternative ways of using traditional skills and keeping them alive. “Made in…India” became an important milestone for many of the participating designers.

Other significant global design events that BE OPEN has been part of over the years are Design Basel with an exposition of projects by students of European top design schools. Design Miami with a conference on sensory design. London Design Festival with an installation in Trafalgar square Chelsea College of Art roundtable on sound design and others.

BE OPEN has worked with the Mayor’s Fund for London, the Mayor's Office and GLA on a number of charitable programmes.

Since 2019, the foundation has been running a multiyear competition programme in support of the UN Sustainable Development Goals. These have included Second Life of Things in Design, focused on SDG 12 (Responsible Consumption and Production), and Design for Sustainable Cities, on SDG 11 (Sustainable Cities and Communities); Design to Nurture the Planet, on SDG 2 (Zero Hunger), and Better Energy by Design, on SDG 7 (Affordable and Clean Energy); Design Your Climate Action, on SDG 13 (Climate Action), and Design Equality with Innovation, on SDG 5 (Gender Equality). Designing Futures 2050 addressed the SDG agenda more broadly, inviting proposals to review and adapt sustainable development priorities with a view to 2050. Among the partners of the programme are the Cumulus Global Association of Art and Design Education and Student Energy. BE OPEN rewards the best work with money prizes, honorary mentions and trips to major international events. The foundation has presented its competition programme at MED/UNECE forums on education for sustainable development in Cyprus, the educational hub of COP28 in Dubai, the Student Energy Summit in Abu Dhabi, COP29 in Baku, and other major international events.

In 2026, Baturina’s BE OPEN Foundation completed Design Equality with Innovation, the seventh edition of its international SDG-focused competition for students and graduates. Dedicated to gender equality (SDG 5), it supported proposals addressing women’s health, education and economic participation. The foundation also supported the Student Energy Summit in Manaus, Brazil, and presented its competition programme in a poster session at the Young Energy Researchers Conference, part of World Sustainable Energy Days in Wels, Austria.

=== BE OPEN Art ===
BE OPEN Art is an online gallery established by the BE OPEN Foundation to showcase emerging artists worldwide, with initiatives including the Regional Art competition programme. In June 2023, at the Centre of Visual Arts and Research in Nicosia, BE OPEN Art hosted an exhibition of artwork selected over the Eastern Mediterranean region. The exhibition was attended by the participating artists and their families, representatives of Cyprus's Ministries of Education and Culture, Nicosia municipality, members of academic, artistic and business communities, guests of the island, etc. Art Limitless, launched in 2025, is a programme within the gallery that combines themed art competitions with curated educational resources on inclusion and sustainability in the arts, including webinars, masterclasses and recommended reading.

In 2026 Regional Art, run by BE OPEN Art, continued for a fourth year, holding rounds for emerging artists in Northeastern Africa and Central Europe and opening an East Asian round in September. The programme combined online exhibitions, public voting and awards. The gallery also announced its 2025 Artist of the Year and Community Support Fund grantees in January 2026.

Art Limitless’s inaugural competition focused on inclusion in the arts, with the winners announced in January 2026. In the second half of 2026, it focused on sustainable art-making and SDG 12 on responsible consumption and production, featuring work using recycled and repurposed materials alongside curated educational resources.

Cyprus Future Heritage, organised by BE OPEN with the Cyprus Handicraft Service and the Society of British and International Interior Design, invited contemporary interpretations of traditional Cypriot weaving and embroidery. Voula Sakka was named the winner in June. Her planned placement with the University of Lancashire’s School of Arts and Media would provide mentoring and experience in preparing for and working backstage at Graduate Fashion Week 2027.

== Personal life ==
In 1991, Baturina married Yury Luzhkov. In 1992 their first daughter, Elena, was born, followed in 1994 by Olga. In November 2010, Luzhkov gave an interview to the Telegraph newspaper stating that the couple were sending their daughters to study in London to protect them from possible persecution by the Russian authorities. Elena Baturina owns a house in Aurach, Austria, and spends a lot of her time there.

It is understood that the family owns a home in the affluent Kensington area of London, purchased in 2013 through an offshore company domiciled in Gibraltar. The property, near Holland Park, was reported in 2018 to be worth at least £25 million. In her interviews Baturina often said that she and Luzhkov were very lucky, as they still loved each other. She enjoys cooking his favourite dish, borscht, and claims that a traditional "Soviet upbringing" made a good housewife of her.

Yelena Baturina drew inspiration from the memory of her husband when developing and implementing the programme of events marking the 90th anniversary of Yury Luzhkov’s birth in 2026.

Baturina has had no contacts with her brother since a public conflict on business issues that occurred in 2007.

She was involved in a libel case against a former financial director for her brother. After failing to appear before a court in December 2019, the court declared Baturina a "fugitive". The subpoena was rescinded in late January by Elista City Court. Allegedly, the subpoena was issued under instruction from the A1 investment company as part of its financial claim to Elena Baturina. In May 2021, Viktor Baturin, his financial director and his representatives have lost their final case in a series of litigations in the Tverskoy District Court of Moscow. As of today, Viktor Baturin is in a detention facility in Moscow, he was detained for a suspected attempt at fraud and admitted committing the crime.

In 2017, another case was initiated against Viktor Baturin for attempted fraud of a large scale and two counts of evidence falsification in a civil case. In 2021 he was formally accused and arrested. In 2022, Viktor Baturin pleaded guilty to fraud and falsification of evidence and in November 2023, found guilty by the Simonovsky court of Moscow and sentenced to six years imprisonment and a fine of 500 thousand rubles.

From 1999 to 2005, Baturina was President of the Equestrian Federation of Russia. Baturina succeeded in raising funds for developing equestrian sport in Russia to the sufficient level for such competition.

Baturina runs the BE OPEN Foundation she set up in 2012. BE OPEN works in close partnership with the Mayor's Fund for London. Baturina was a trustee for the Mayor's Fund for London from 2017 to 2019.

=== Personal wealth ===
In 2021, the Sunday Times Rich List estimated Baturina's net worth to be £1.133 billion. In 2018 and 2019, her net worth was estimated at $1.2 billion. In 2020, Forbes announced that Baturina's position as the richest woman in Russia was overtaken by Tatyana Bakalchuk, the founder of Wildberries, with a net worth of $1.4 billion.

According to Forbes, Baturina's net worth was US$4.2 billion in 2008, up from US$3.1 billion in 2007, US$2.3 billion in 2006 and US$1.1 billion in 2004. According to magazine Finans, her wealth fell during the credit crunch to just US$1 billion in February 2009, causing her to ask the Russian government for a bailout for Inteko. Her wealth, as of 2012, was listed as US$1.1 billion.

In the noughties, Baturina owned hotels in the Black Sea tourist resort of Sochi, over 72,000 hectares of agricultural land in the Belgorod Oblast and also a factory that produces a million cans of sweetened condensed milk each year. In the following decade - a hotel in Dublin through a private foundation in Austria, other hotels in Austria and the Czech Republic, But now all the assets except for the hotel in Dublin are no longer associated with Baturina.

She owns a private jet. She claims to own one of the largest private collections of Russian Imperial porcelain, preferring the porcelain of the era of Nicholay I. In April 2011, Yelena Baturina donated about 40 pieces of art – a part of her collection of rare porcelain – to the "Tsaritsyno" museum in Moscow. Up to early 2010s, she owned the "Veedern" horse breeding estate founded in the 18th century. In 2020, Alexander Luzhkov, Yury Luzhkov's son from his previous marriage, became the sole owner of the estate. After a major reconstruction the estate is now successfully breeding Hanoverian and Trakehner horses.

In 2011, Baturina won a lawsuit against the British newspaper "The Sunday Times", which attributed to the Russian businesswoman the acquisition of Witanhurst estate in London, which is the second value after Buckingham Palace. As a result, the newspaper published a retraction and apologized.

== Honours and awards ==
Baturina won the State Prize of the Russian Federation for Science and Technology in 2003. Inteco and its projects have won numerous awards and competitions, including: the "Russian Building Olympus" prize for "Architecture and Design Planning" (2008); "Brand of the Year/EFFIE 2007"; national prize for "Construction and Real Estate" (2008); International Star of Leadership award for quality at the 13th Business Initiative Directions (BID) international convention (Paris, 2009), "Company of the Year" national prize for business for "The Best Investment and Construction Company in Russia in 2009" (2009); International Award for Technology & Quality (Madrid, 2010); International Construction Award (France, 2011).

== See also ==
- List of female billionaires

Political offices
Preceded by Irina Popova	First Lady of Moscow; 1992–2010	Succeeded by Irina Sobyanina
