= Inteco =

Russian investment and construction company

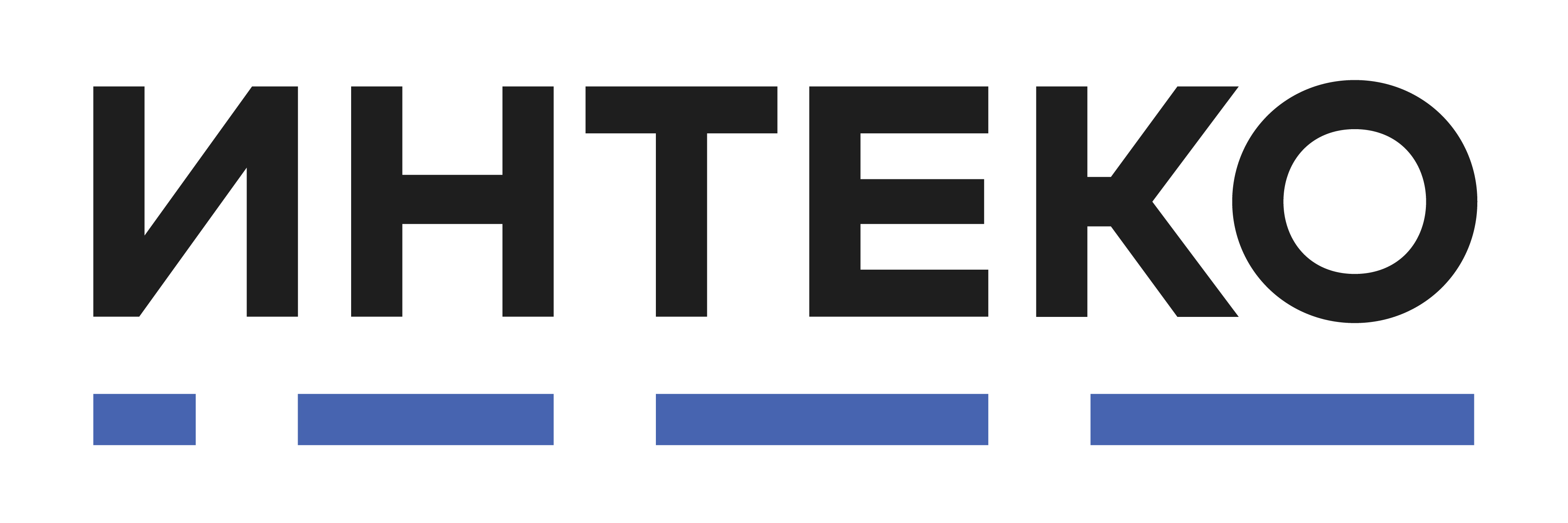
- Type: Joint-stock company
- Industry: Real estate, Construction
- Founded: 1991
- Headquarters: Moscow, Russia
- Key people: Alexander Nikolaev (President), Alexander Sokolov (Chairman)
- Website: Official website

INTECO (Интеко in Russian) is a Russian developer group of companies. It specializes in integrated development projects in Moscow and the regions of Russia (Rostov-on-Don, Saint Petersburg and Leningrad oblast). The controlling shareholder of INTEСO is National Bank TRUST. Group Headquarters are located in Moscow.

== History ==
Inteco was founded by Elena Baturina along with her brother Viktor Baturin in 1991 as a plastics company. It was awarded the contract to produce seats for Luzhniki Stadium, Moscow's largest stadium, in 1995. This drew allegations of corruption since Baturina's husband, Yuriy Luzhkov, was the mayor of Moscow between 1992 and 2010.

Also in 1995, Inteco was awarded a contract to produce plates for Russkoe Bistro, a fastfood chain set up by Luzhkov and owned by Moscow city authorities. Later Inteco moved into the construction trade, despite Baturina stating that this would be a conflict of interest: "as the mayor’s wife, I have to be very careful not to hurt my company’s reputation". Inteco became very successful and at one time produced 20% of all new buildings in the capital. Inteco's leadership has insisted to have been awarded all tenders in a fair manner and according to the relevant laws.

In 2011, INTEСO was sold to SAFMAR group. In 2017, control over INTEСO passed to the Banking Sector Consolidation Fund, which formed a new board of directors of the company. In 2018, the shares of INTECO were transferred to the Bank of Non-core Assets, established on the basis of the bank «TRUST» (open joint-stock company) - Russian financial institution with the majority state participation, formed within the framework of the activities of the Central Bank of the Russian Federation for the rehabilitation of the banking system.

In 2019, INTEСO the company re-branded and introduced a new logo and for the first time in 7 years put on sale new construction projects on the Moscow real estate market (business class housing complex West Garden and comfort class housing complex Westerdam). In October 2020, TRUST gathered 100% of shares of INTECO.

== Developments ==
In 2005 Inteco sold its concrete works, which accounted for a third of company revenues, and DSK-3, a producer of prefabricated buildings, for $1.1 billion. Evrotsement bought the concrete business for 3-5 times the going market price. PIK Group bought DSK-3. The reason for the sale was thought to be the impending end to Luzhkov's term in office.

In 2007 Viktor Baturin sued Inteco for $120 million due to alleged wrongful dismissal. He was fired in 2005 and his 1% share of the company bought by Inteco for $21 million. Baturin insists however that his share was in fact 25% until it mysteriously disappeared in 2002 or 2003.

Following Luzhkov's dismissal from his position as mayor of Moscow, he alleged to The Telegraph newspaper that the Russian authorities were planning to break up the Inteco.

Mikail Shishkhanov and Sberbank Investments acquired the company in 2011, with Shishkanov buying 95 percent of the shares and Sberbank the remaining five.

Facing high debts, the company was taken over by the Russian Central Bank in 2017 following an asset transfer by owner Mikail Shishkhanov. Inteco is expected to post a profit for the first time in years in 2020, and would consider an IPO at a later date. As of July 2019, the firm was $474.26 million in debt.

=== 2005 attacks ===
On October 9, 2005, executive director of Inteko-agro Alexander Annenkov was attacked by three assailants armed with axes. He survived.

On October 13, 2005, Inteco lawyer Dmitry Steinberg was shot at the entrance to his house.
