= Monokub =

Monokub (Russian: Монокуб) motherboard with one Elbrus-2C+ CPU at 500 MHz

Monokub (Russian: Монокуб) is a computer motherboard based on the Russian Elbrus 2000 computer architecture, which form the basis for the Monoblock PC office workstation.

The motherboard has a miniITX formfactor and contains a single Elbrus-2C+ microprocessor with a clock frequency of 500 MHz. The memory controller provides a dual-channel memory mode. The board has two DDR2-800 memory slots, which enables up to 16 GB of RAM memory (using ECC modules). It also supports expansion boards using PCI Express x16 bus. In addition there is an on-board Gigabit Ethernet interface, 4 USB 2.0, RS-232 interface, DVI connector and audio input/output ports.
