= Tatyana Kim =

Russian businesswoman (born 1975)

- Татьяна Ким
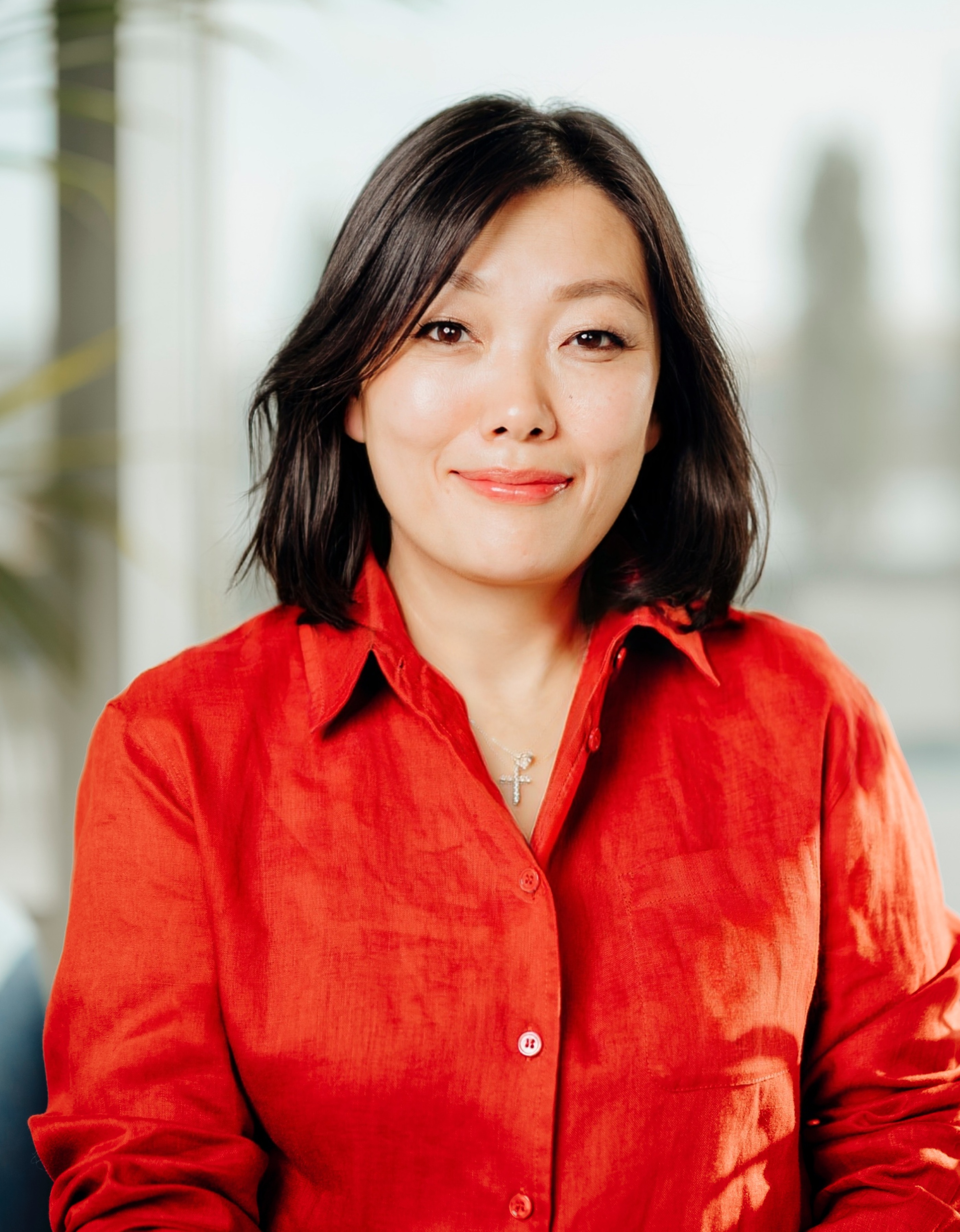
- Kim in 2025
- Born: Tatyana Vladimirovna Kim; 16 October 1975 (age 51); Grozny, Checheno-Ingush ASSR Russian SFSR, Soviet Union
- Occupations: Founder and CEO of Wildberries
- Children: 7

Tatyana Vladimirovna Kim (Russian: Татья́на Влади́мировна Ким; born 16 October 1975), formerly known as Tatyana Vladimirovna Bakalchuk (Russian: Татья́на Влади́мировна Бакальчу́к), is a Russian entrepreneur, founder and CEO of Wildberries, the largest Russian online retailer, and the country's first self-made female billionaire. In July 2026, Kim's net worth amounted to US$8.1 billion.

== Early life ==
Tatyana Kim was born on 16 October 1975, in Grozny in a ethnic Korean family. Her father was an engineer, and her mother was a primary school teacher. She finished school in Moscow oblast and in 1997 graduated from Kolomna University. She then took a job as an English teacher at a school and worked part-time as a private tutor.

She planned to move to Moscow and continue her education as a designer. She had to abandon that plan and return to teaching English when the 1998 financial crisis struck Russia.

In the early 2000s, she met her future husband Vladislav Bakalchuk, an entrepreneur and a founder of Utech ISP. In 2004, after giving birth to her first child, Kim launched Wildberries, which initially focused on reselling apparel from the Otto and Quelle catalogs.

According to the company's official history, Kim started the business without capital experience, or professional education. However, she obtained starting capital from her husband. Notably, this sum was estimated at several million dollars. Shortly before that, he sold the Internet provider UTech to Gazprombank for 7.5 million dollars.

According to reporting in the Russian newspaper The Bell claims that the spouses did not initially sell clothes solely from the Otto or Quelle catalogs, but also sold garments in a second-hand store in the "Dynamite" shopping center in the Vykhino-Zhulebino District. The store, which was marketed as an outlet store, sold 1,000 varieties of second-hand clothes from Europe. Some of the items were also distributed through a webpage. In 2003, the shopping center's address was listed in the contacts of the D-Luxe catalog published by Bakalchuk's and Fadeev's UT Design studio. Contrary to this, Wildberries claims that the second-hand store was not affiliated with the company.

== Career ==
By 2006, Wildberries got an office in Milkovo, Moscow region, a team of couriers, phone operators, and an IT crew. By that time, the company started to sell apparel by small local European brands and the excess stock of old collections of well-known brands. Wildberries was among the first Russian e-commerce companies to offer a flat delivery rate and free try-on and to build a network of pick-up points with fitting rooms. By 2020, the company operated over 7,000 pick-up points.

As of 2026, Wildberries had over 90,000 pickup points across its markets of presence, handling ~90% of deliveries and making collection accessible within walking distance. The company operates over 4 million sqm of self-built warehouses in Russia and is constructing the largest logistics facilities in Kazakhstan, Uzbekistan, and Belarus to accelerate local deliveries and sales.

During the 2014—2016 financial crisis, Wildberries switched to a platform business model (the one employed by Amazon). The company benefited from the dramatic increase in online orders during the COVID-19 pandemic (starting in 2020).

Under Kim's leadership, Wildberries expanded into Belarus, Kazakhstan, Uzbekistan, Tajikistan, Armenia, Kyrgyzstan, and Georgia.

Moreover, Tatyana established Wildberries Holdings Ltd in Cyprus in 2018.

By 2022, according to a Data Insight report, Wildberries was the largest e-store in Russia. In 2019, the company's value was estimated at $1 billion, which made Kim the second woman in Russia to become a billionaire, and by 2020, she became the wealthiest woman in Russia, worth $1.4 billion. Forbes US edition noted her as one of the most notable new billionaires. By 2021, her fortune grew by 800% (compared to 2020) to $13 billion.

It is speculated that Denis Manturov and Mikhail Mishustin are the patrons of Wildberries. Headed by Manturov, the Russian Ministry of Industry and Trade drafted a government decree in 2020. The decree proposed to subsidize Russian marketplaces' logistics expenses. The absence of foreign shareholders was the primary condition for receiving governmental support. Consequently, only one marketplace – Wildberries – could meet these criteria.

In 2020, Kim acquired Standard-Credit Bank, which Samvel Karapetyan's Tashir Holding previously controlled. The bank was renamed Wildberries Bank. According to information from the "Banki.ru" webpage, in October or November of the same year, the bank's net assets decreased by 31.4 million rubles, and its loan portfolio lost almost 23.5 million rubles. Furthermore, according to the "Bank Analysis" website, at the beginning of 2022, more than 65% of Standard-Credit's assets consisted of credits. Some media speculate that the bank's purchase was necessary to withdraw cash from the debt-ridden retailer.

From 2021 to 2022, Kim was a member of the supervisory board of VTB Bank, which is majority state-owned. In December 2021, she joined the All-Russia People's Front.

In 2021, the Russian Ministry of Digital Development added four new categories (including e-commerce) to the list of preinstalled applications. Only Wildberries could meet the proposed criteria.

In 2022, the Ministry of Industry and Trade publicly stated that the online market Wildberries sells counterfeit products.

After the outbreak of the Russo-Ukrainian War, Kim was allegedly directly involved in talks with the Russian Federal AntiMonopoly Service over legalizing parallel imports (importing products from abroad without the permission of the trademark owner).

In 2022 the sales turnover of Wildberries increased by 98%, amounting to 1.669 trillion rubles. The sum constituted one-third of total sales turnover of Russian online commerce in 2022.

In April 2023, Kim announced the search for a new Russian-language brand instead of Wildberries due to the ban on using foreign words in Russian advertising. In 2022, the marketplace changed the name of its website to Yagodki for one day as part of a marketing campaign.

In 2023, Kim was elected head of the Russian-Armenian Business Council.

== Innovation and social initiatives ==
As of 2026, Wildberries' largest warehouses feature AI-powered automation including sorting conveyors, floor robots, and robotic arms, improving efficiency and worker safety.

Kim promotes AI tools like shopping assistants, AI-generated product photos and videos, and virtual fitting rooms, alongside the 2023 Wibes social commerce app for 90-second shopping videos with one-tap purchases.

As of 2025, Tatyana Kim emphasized the importance of e-commerce opportunities for women entrepreneurs, noting they comprised 58% of Wildberries sellers. Wildberries provides business training from scratch and supports women's entrepreneurship initiatives in its markets of presence.

The company supports women in Central Asia through partnerships like Uzbekistan Women Association (2024) and Women in Tech Kyrgyzstan (2025), contributing to growth from 300K to 2.1M female entrepreneurs in Uzbekistan.

== Sanctions ==
In 2021, the government of Ukraine imposed sanctions over Tatyana Kim and Vladislav Bakalchuk and Wildberries for selling Russian military uniforms and anti-Ukrainian literature.

After the 2022 Russian invasion of Ukraine, Poland added Wildberries and Kim to its sanctions list because of her connections with VTB Bank.

== Forbes ranking ==
Tatyana Kim is the richest woman in Russia. Along with Yelena Baturina, they are the only two female billionaires in the country. In December 2021, Forbes named Tatyana, who owned 99 percent of the Wildberries e-commerce platform, the wealth growth dynamic leader among the world's billionaires. In 2021, her business grew by over 1,000 percent. Until December 31, 2019, Tatyana was the sole owner, but then she transferred 1% to her husband Vladislav Bakalchuk, thus moving their family to the first place in the Forbes ranking of Russia's richest families—ahead of the Rotenbergs. According to experts, transferring a share of the property is purely technical. Under Russian legislation, organizations with a sole owner cannot create 100% subsidiaries. The joint ownership of the company will enable Wildberries to create subsidiaries under a simplified procedure, building the structure of a more successful corporation.

In 2025, Tatyana Kim was included in Forbes’ ranking of the world’s 50 richest self-made women (those who achieved success and wealth through their own efforts). Kim placed 18th and was the only Russian on the list. At 49, she was also one of the youngest participants in the ranking — the only person younger than her was Australian entrepreneur Melanie Perkins (38), the founder of the software company Canva.

== Personal life ==
In the early 2000s, she met Vladislav Bakalchuk; they married a month and a half later. Together, they have seven children.

In June 2024, Wildberries announced a merger with Russ, the largest advertising operator in Russia. On July 21, 2024, Ramzan Kadyrov, the head of Chechnya, stated on his Telegram channel that Vladislav Bakalchuk had visited him and complained about "serious problems both within the family and with the family-founded business." According to Bakalchuk, he and Kadyrov "used to be friends and were in regular contact." Kadyrov published a video in which Bakalchuk detailed the conflict.

Kadyrov called the situation a hostile takeover, promising to relay the information to the national leadership. Tatyana responded with a statement on her own Telegram channel: "This is not a hostile takeover. This is a divorce. From the very beginning, everything was agreed upon with Vladislav — he personally attended the presentation of the new structure of the merged company to the top management," she wrote.

According to a Forbes source, Vladislav Bakalchuk left the company in early July. On July 24, 2024, Vladislav Bakalchuk stated that, in the event of a divorce settlement, he intended to claim 50% of the company stake.

On April 17, the Savelovsky District Court of Moscow ruled in favor of Tatyana Kim in the property division case with Vladislav Bakalchuk. The judge upheld Kim’s claims and awarded her Bakalchuk’s 1% stake in LLC Wildberries, making her the sole owner of 100% of the company. She also retained 100% ownership of LLC Wildberries Bank, as well as all funds held in her personal accounts.

In September 2024 Vladislav was arrested on a murder charge following a deadly shootout which occurred after he and other armed men raided Wildberries' Moscow headquarters. Following the incident, Tatyana announced that she was reverting to her maiden surname. Their divorce was finalised in 2025.

Kim has a sister - Maria Andreeva (née Kim). According to information from her social networks, Andreeva works at Wildberries and has another sister, 20-year-old Albina Tsoy. In turn, Tsoy listed Maxim and Nadezhda Kim among her close relatives. They are also Wildberries employees.

Tatyana's brother, Yuri Tsoy, is a former CEO of Starprofi. He is a nephew of Sergei Tsoy, Rosneft vice president and former head of Yury Luzhkov's press service. Sergei Tsoy's wife, Anna Kim, is known by the pseudonym Anita Tsoy. She is believed to be a family friend of Rosneft head Igor Sechin.

=== Drone strikes on Wildberries warehouses ===
In July 2026, two Wildberries logistics warehouses in Tambov and Elektrostal were struck by Ukrainian drones during overnight attacks, resulting in eight deaths and 62 injuries according to Russian regional officials. Kim described the events as a "terrible night" for Russia and for the company. The merged RWB group, which includes Wildberries and the advertising firm Russ, was valued at approximately $12.6 billion by Forbes Russia earlier that year.

By mid-August, fully one-third of Wildberries warehouses and logistics centers had been struck, with substantial destruction of buildings and goods. One of the 13 was the largest Wildberries logistics warehouse (over 200,000 m^{2}) at Koledino in the Podolsk urban district of southern Moscow.
