= Ulmart =

Russian online retailer

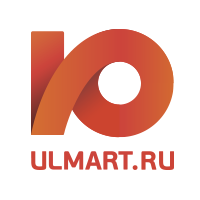
- Type: Private
- Industry: Online retailing
- Founded: 2008; 18 years ago
- Founder: Sergey Fedorinov; Alexei Nikitin
- Defunct: March 1, 2020; 6 years ago
- Fate: Liquidation
- Headquarters: St. Petersburg, Russia
- Key people: Dmitry Kostygin (BD Chairman)
- Products: Consumer goods
- Revenue: ▲ Approx. bln 62.7 RUB (2015)
- Number of employees: 6500 persons (2014)
- Website: ulmart.ru

Ulmart was a Russian private online retailer focused on e-commerce. The company was founded in 2008 and headquartered in Saint-Petersburg. In 2013, Ulmart led Russian e-trade in revenue, with a revenue of approximately $1 billion. It filed for bankruptcy in January 2020, then liquidated its assets and shut down operations on March 1, 2020.

== History ==
The Ulmart project originated with Ultra Electronics. Later, the Ulmart brand, as well as the platform and equipment of the Ultra Electronics merchandise network, were acquired by Kombrig.

On July 1, 2008, in St. Petersburg at Kondratievsky prospect 15, the company launched its first cybermarket. In early 2009, Ulmart undertook the task of upgrading the equipment that was purchased from Ultra Electronics. During the same year, the company opened a full-format shop in Moscow, and the first Ulmart outposts.

In 2010, the company opened its second Cash & Carry store in St. Petersburg, located on Blagodatnaya Street.

In February 2013, the company launched a new version of the Ulmart website. In the same year, the company's sales exceeded bln $1, and Ulmart topped the 20 Russian Major Online Shops according to Forbes.

In Spring 2014, Ulmart acquired a share in Dream Industries (the operator of the music service Zvooq and the book service Bookmate). These services were further integrated into the ulmart.ru platform. In the fall of the same year, Ulmart bought out 100% of the shares of LLC Satellite Company, the manager of the No Limit Electronics (NLE) network (the major distributor of Tricolor TV).

In 2015, Ulmart was ranked third amongst the Russian major online companies according to Forbes, after Yandex and the Mail.ru Group. Its estimated value was bln $1.4. In 2016 Forbes decreased its estimate to bln $1.1.

In 2015, the company announced plans to hold an IPO in 2016. At the St. Petersburg International Economic Forum it was announced to delay it to 2017. According to the management, an IPO would happen in very late case in 2018.

In November 2015, Ulmart opened the first major facility of the new format – the urban fulfillment center, which combined warehouse, and space for shopping, with an area of 22 500 sq m. the Facility is located on Pulkovskoe highway in St. Petersburg.

In November 2016, the company commissioned a second fulfillment center with an area of 52 000 sq. m. located at Piskarevskiy Prospekt in Saint-Petersburg.

In 2017, Ulmart, conjointly with the Fund "Recongress" organized official representative of Russian business at the world economic forum in Davos – "Russian house".

== Owners and governance ==
- Dmitry Kostygin, chairman of the board of directors – 31,6%
- August Meyer, Member of the board of directors – 29,9%
- Mikhail Vasinkevich – 38,5%

== Activities ==
Based on its performance in IH 2016, the company's logistical infrastructure encompasses over 400 facilities in various formats, located in 6 federal districts:

- 2 suburban fulfillment center;
- 1 distribution center;
- 46 urban centers of execution of orders;
- 365 the point of issuing orders — Ulmart Outpost.

Ulmart facilities are situated in over 240 Russian cities (St. Petersburg, Moscow, Samara, Kazan, Krasnodar, Novorossiysk, Yekaterinburg and others). The aggregate production line of the company includes over mln 12 Stock keeping units.

Year	Turnover
2009	RUB 3,3 bln.
2010	RUB 7,0 bln.
2011	RUB 13,7 bln.
2012	RUB 24,6 bln.
2013	RUB 39,7 bln.
2014	RUB 60,0 bln.
2015	RUB 62,7 bln.
H1 2016	RUB 20,7 bln.

In 2009, Ulmart acquired the trademark and operational facilities of MicroXperts. This was originally a North American company for computer and server production, with its production facilities based in Russia since 1993. The brand produces PCs, laptops, ultrabooks and monoblocks.

Since 2013, the company has used the ZIFRO brand for digital devices such as smartphones and tablets. The company is also developing other brands, such as: Molecula (accessories for digital devices), Roadweller (automotive goods), Lemantino (goods for children), and Forhead (grills, greenhouses).

In 2016 Ulmart launched several projects working on the model of the marketplace: Wishni.ru, and Ulmart Global. In addition, the company also launched projects: Slivy.ru, Thelabels.ru, and shopping messenger "Alol". Ulmart also launched a marketplace for suppliers on its online storefront, customers could purchase goods directly from the warehouses of partners of the company.

== Setup ==
The Ulmart Group of Companies consists of NJSC Ulmart, LLC Ulmart RSK, LLC Ulmart PZK, and LLC Ulmart Development.

== Ratings ==
=== 2010–2012 ===
- Ulmart was ranked first in the survey among readers of the site iXBT.com "brand of the year" in the nomination "Best retail company" in 2010, 2011 and 2012;
- In 2012, Ulmart topped the Online Retailer Russia Top 30.;
- Ulmart was ranked sixth in the Web Only To-500 of the Largest Online Retailers of Europe (according to Internet Retailer).

=== 2013 ===
- Based on its 2013 performance, Ulmart topped the list of the 20 Major Online Shops in Russia, according to Forbes.
- In 2013, according to Kommersant – Company Success Stories, Ulmart was ranked third amongst the Largest Online Retailers of Runet, with an average monthly turnover of RUB 2 bln.
- In 2013, the company topped the Largest Online Shops in Russia according to Forbes.

=== 2015 ===
- From 2013 to 2015, the company was recognized amongst the Top Most Efficient Online Companies of Runet, according to Forbes;
- The company received a prestigious prize at the Online Retail Russia Awards 2015 in the Best Online Shop category.;
- The company was awarded the Grand-Prix National Professional Prize for Great Turnover 2015.;

=== 2016 ===
- The company was recognized as the leader in the sphere of Business Services, according to the VI Award for Consumer Rights and Service Quality.;
- The company topped the Ecommerce Index Top 100 rating in 2016.;
- In 2016 Ulmart became the winner of the Award "Time of Innovations" in the nomination "project of the year, category — the Business and Service" with the project "Suburban fulfillment center — innovative logistics facility for e-commerce";
- In 2016, Ulmart became the world's top-50 in the e-commerce version of the Deloitte and became the only Russian Internet company in this rating.

=== 2017 ===
- 7th place in the Forbes's "20 most expensive companies of the Runet – 2017" ranking;
- 2nd place in the "HR-brand 2016" Award.
