= Viktor Baturin =

Russian businessman

- Born: Viktor Nikolaevich Baturin; October 2, 1956 (age 70); Moscow, RSFSR, USSR (now Russia)
- Occupations: Politician, businessman
- Spouses: Yulia Saltovets; Yana Rudkovskaya; Ilona Obraztsova
- Relatives: Yelena Baturina (sister); Natalia Yevtushenkova (sister)

Viktor Nikolaevich Baturin (Russian: Виктор Николаевич Батурин; born 2 October 1956) is a Russian businessman, producer, the elder brother of Yelena Baturina (one of the richest women in Russia, the widow of Yuri Luzhkov) and Chairman of the Government of Kalmykia (November 2, 1998 — January 17, 1999).

== Biography ==
Baturin graduated from The State University of Management in 1983. He worked in senior positions in the aerospace industry.

In 1991 Baturin became the director of Russian construction company Inteco. Viktor and Yelena were made co-founders of the company.

By the end of the 1990s, the Baturins' company entered the construction business and acted as one of the general contractors for the construction of the City Chess in Kalmykia. The idea of arranging a special territory for holding international chess tournaments belonged to the President of Kalmykia, Kirsan Ilyumzhinov.

In October 1998, Baturin took the post of chairman of the government of the Republic of Kalmykia, and in January 1999 became the state adviser to Ilyumzhinov, but held this post only until February 1999.

From 1999 to 2005, Baturin was the first vice-president of Inteco.

In 2006, Viktor and Yelena divided the business. In 2007, on February 15, they entered into a settlement agreement, abandoning mutual claims.

As a result, Viktor manages half of the shares of the agrarian division of the company and part of the assets in Sochi.

In 2011, even more difficult times came for an entrepreneur, he was found guilty by a Moscow court. The entrepreneur was charged with fraudulent real estate transactions in the central district of Moscow. The result was a suspended sentence of three years.

After just a few months, an even bigger charge of bill fraud followed. The sentence this time became not conditional, but quite real. The term of stay in the colony was assigned to 7 years. And on January 22, 2016, the Supreme Court of Kalmykia was released from the colony ahead of schedule, 2 years 10 months and 7 days before the end of the term. The court, which was not served, was replaced by a fine.

In July 2021, it became known that the central office of the Investigative Committee of Russia opened a criminal case against Baturin on attempted fraud. In November 2023, he was sentenced to six years in prison.
