= Monoblock PC =

Monoblock PC is a computer workstation based on the Elbrus 2000 architecture. It was developed in Russia as a joint effort between Kraftway and the Moscow Center of SPARC Technologies (MCST).

== Specifications ==
- Based on the Monokub motherboard with one Elbrus-2C+ processor at 500 MHz
- Heat pipe-based cooling system
- 20" touchscreen with 1600x900 resolution
- SATA 2.5" hard drive, with room for one extra drive
- DVD-RW drive
- Wi-Fi using adapter
- USB hub with card reader and panel audio header
- 2 built-in 4 W loudspeakers
- Connector for external power supply 19 V, 8 A

== Operating system ==
- Elbrus operating system based on the Linux 2.6.33 kernel
- Elbrus 2000 reportedly also runs Microsoft Windows
