= Eugene (given name) =

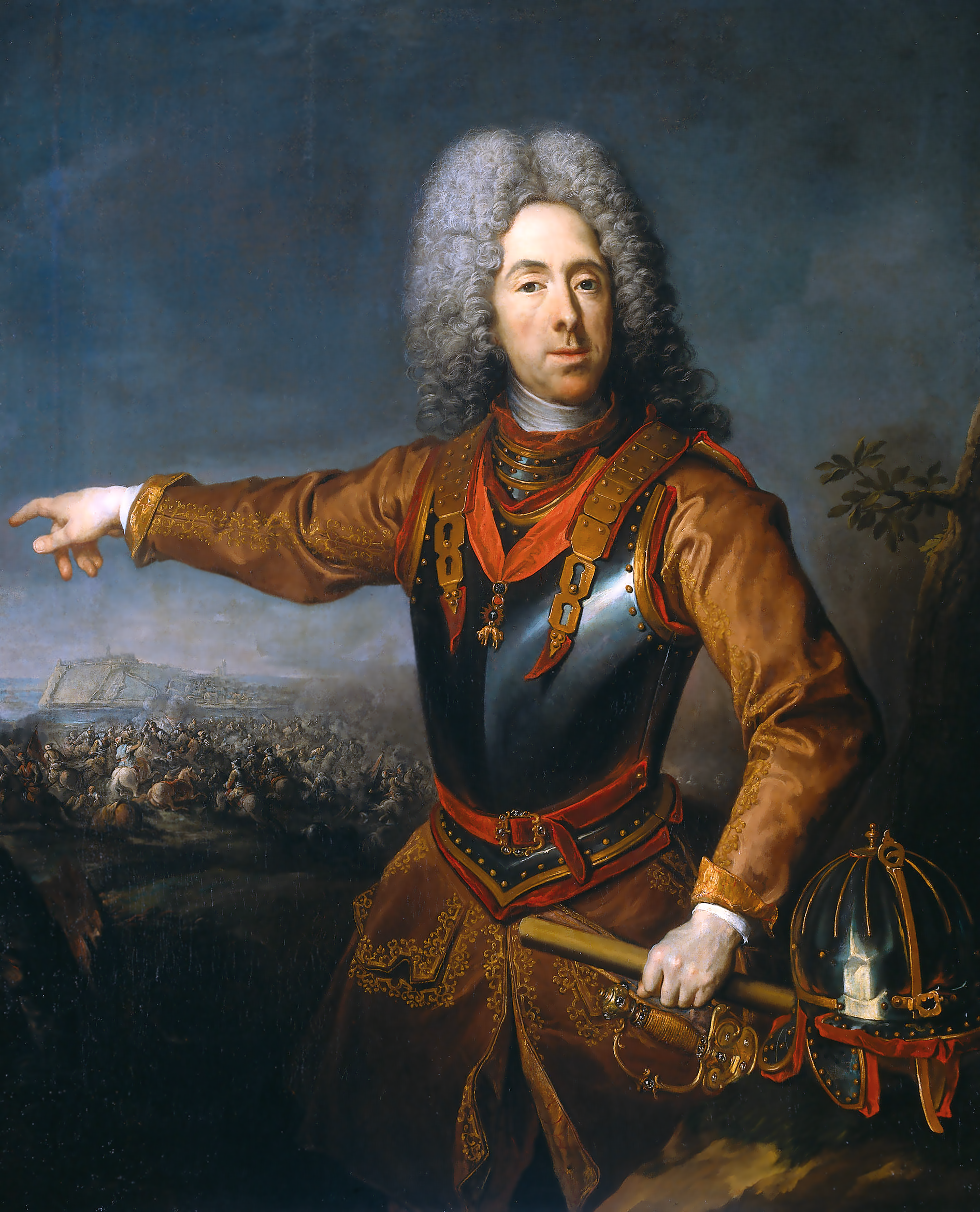
- Prince Eugene of Savoy, one of the greatest military commanders of the 17th and 18th centuries.
- Pronunciation: /juːˈdʒiːn/ yoo-JEEN
- Gender: Male

Origin
- Origin: Greek
- Meaning: "noble", "well-born"
- Region of origin: Greece, Southern Europe

Other names
- Nickname: Gene
- Related names: Owen, Eòghann, Euan, Kevin, Eugenie, Eugenio, Eugênio, Eugine, Yu-jin

Eugene is a common masculine given name that comes from the Greek εὐγενής (eugenēs), "noble", literally "well-born", from εὖ (eu), "well" and γένος (genos), "race, stock, kin". Gene is a common shortened form. The feminine variant is Eugenia or Eugenie.

Other male foreign-language variants include:

Abkhaz	Еуџьин, Евгени (Euj’in, Evgeni)
Adyghe	Юджин (Yudžin)
Albanian	Gjin, Eugjen, Efgjen
Altai	Юджин (Yudžin)
Afar	Yujiin, Eyujin
Arabic	يوجين (Yujin)
Armenian	Յուջին (Yujin)
Arpitan	Eugêne, Genio
Asturian	Oxenu
Avar	Юджин, Евгений (Yudžin, Yevgeniy)
Azerbaijani	Yevgen
Balinese	Eugeneus
Basque	Euken(i)
Belarusian	Jaŭhien (Яўген), Jaŭhienij (Яўгеній), Yauhen (Яўген)
Breton	Ujan
Bosnian	Judžin
Bulgarian	Евгени (Evgeni)
Cantonese	尤金, 尤基因 (Yàuhgām, Yàuhgēiyān)
Catalan	Eugeni
Chinese (Traditional)	尤金 (Yóujīn)
Chechen	Евгений (Evgeniy)
Croatian	Eugen
Czech	Evžen, Eugen
Dutch	Eugeen
Esperanto	Eŭgeno
Estonian	Jevgeni
Faroese	Evgenus
French	Eugène, Yvain
Frisian	Eugenius
Fijian	Eujini, Ujini
Finnish	Eugenius
Friulian	Eugjen
Fulani	Yujen, Yugene
Ga	Yujeni
Galician	Uxío
German	Eugen, Eugine
Georgian	ევგენი (Evgeni)
Greek	Ευγένιος (Eugénios)
Hebrew	יוּגִ'ין (Yûgīyn')
Hindi	यूजीन (Yujina)
Hungarian	Jenő, Eugén
Hunsrik	Eugênio
Icelandic	Evgeníus
Indonesia	Eguene
Irish	Eoghan
Italian	Eugenio
Inuktitut	ᔫᔩᓐ, ᐃᔫᔩᓐ (Juujiin, Ijuujiin)
Jamaican Patois	Yuujin
Japanese	ユージーン (romanized as Yūjīn)
Jingpo	Yujin, Eujini
Kanuri	Eujin
Kannada	ಯುಜೀನ್ (Yujīn)
Karbardian	Юджин (Yudžin)
Kazakh	Евгений (Evgenïy)
Khmer	យូហ្គេន (Youhken)
Kiga	Yujiini
Kikongo	Ugène
Korean	유진 (romanized as Yujin or Yoojin)
Komi	Евгений, Юджын (Evgeniy, Yudžyn)
Kurdish	Yucîn
Lao	ຢູເຈນ (Yuchen)
Latin	Eugenius
Latvian	Eižens, Jūdžīns
Latgalian	Eugenijs, Jugenijs, Eudžins
Lithuanian	Eugenijus
Macedonian	Евгениј (Evgenij)
Malaylam	യൂജിൻ (Yoojin)
Maltese	Ewġenju
Manx	Eugeen
Mongolian	Евгений, Южин (Yevgyenii, Yujin)
Occitan	Eugèni
Odia	ୟୁଜିନ୍ (Yujin)
Pashto	یوجین (Yujin)
Persian	یوجین (Yūjyin)
Piedmontese	Genio
Polish	Eugeniusz (Gienek)
Portuguese	Eugênio (Brazil), Eugénio (Portugal)
Romanian	Eugen, Eugeniu
Romani	Eugenio
Russian	Евгений (transliterated as Evgeni, Evgeniy, Evgeny, Evgenii, Evgueni, Eugeny, Eugeniy, Ievgeny, Jevgeni, Jevgeny, Yevgeny, Yevgeni, Yevgeniy, in German often as Jewgenij or Jewgeni), Юджин (Yudžin)
Rundi	Ewuzeni, Yujeni
Samoan	Iuteni
Scottish Gaelic	Eòghann, Ewan, Euan
Serbian	Еуген (Eugen), Евгеније (Evgenije)
Sicilian	Eugeniu
Silesian	Eugyn, Eugynisz
Slovak	Eugen
Slovenian	Evgen
Sindhi	يوجين (Yujeen)
Spanish	Eugenio
Swahili	Yugenesi
Swedish	Eugen
Syriac	ܐܘܓܝܢ (Augin)
Tajik	Евгений, Юҷин (Еvgеniy, Yujin)
Tamazight	ⵢⵓⵊⵉⵏ (yujin)
Tamil	யூஜின் (Youjin)
Telugu	యూజీన్ (Yujin)
Tibetan	ཡུ་ཇིན། (Yujin)
Turkish	Yevgeny, Eiugenios, Eugen, Yucin
Turkmen	Ýewgen, Ýujin
Urdu	یوجین (Yujin)
Ukrainian	Євген (national translit. Yevhen, also occur Ievhen, Yevgen, Ievgen), Євгеній (Yevhenii, also occur Yevgenii, Ievhenii, Ievgenii, Yevheniy, Yevgeniy, Ievheniy), Евген (Evhen), Ївген (Yivhen)
Uzbek	Evgeniy, Yevgeniy, Yujin
Uyghur	ئېۋگېن, يۈجىن (Éwgén, Yüjin)
Welsh	Owain, Owen, Ouein, Oen, Ewein, Ywein/Ywain, Yuein,
Yiddish	יוגין (Yugyn)
Zapotec	Eugenio

== People ==
Notable people with the given name Eugene or Eugène include:

=== Christianity ===
- Eugene or Eugenios of Trebizond, 4th century Christian saint and martyr
- St. Eugene, one of the deacons of saint Zenobius of Florence
- Eugene (Eoghan) (died c. 618), Irish saint
- Pope Eugene I (died 657), Italian pope from 655 to 657
- Pope Eugene II (died 827), Italian pope from 824 to 827
- Pope Eugene III (died 1153), Italian pope from 1145 to 1153
- Pope Eugene IV (1383–1447), Italian pope from 1431 to 1447
- Eugène Philippe LaRocque (1927–2018), Roman Catholic bishop from Canada
- Eugene Antonio Marino (1934–2000), first African-American archbishop in the United States

=== Military ===
- Prince Eugene of Savoy (1663–1736), Austrian general, statesman of the Holy Roman Empire and the Austrian monarchy
- Eugène de Beauharnais (1781–1824), stepson and adopted child of Napoleon
- Eugene Goodman (born 1980), American United States Capitol Police officer who diverted invading rioters from the United States Senate chamber during the January 6 Capitol attack
- Eugene A. Greene (1921–1942), American sailor, posthumous recipient of the Navy Cross
- Eugene Hasenfus (1941–2025), United States Marine helping the right-wing rebel Contras in Nicaragua
- Eugène Maizan (1819–1845), French naval lieutenant and explorer
- Eugene Sledge (1923–2001), American World War II Marine and academic
- Eugene Sullivan (1918–1942), American sailor, one of the Sullivan brothers

=== Television and films ===
- Gene L. Coon (1924–1973), American screenwriter and television producer
- Eugene Cordero (born 1986), American actor
- Eugene Robert Glazer (born 1942), American actor
- Gene Hackman (1930–2025), American actor
- Gene Kelly (1912–1996), American dancer, actor, singer, director, producer, and choreographer
- Eugene Levy (born 1946), Canadian actor
- Eugene Mirman (born 1974), Russian-born American comedian, writer, and filmmaker
- Gene Rayburn (1917–1999), American radio personality and game show host
- Gene Roddenberry (1921–1991), American scriptwriter and producer
- Eugène Saccomano (1936–2019), French radio journalist and non-fiction author
- Gene Siskel (1946–1999), American film critic

=== Music ===
- Gene Allison (1934–2004), American R&B singer
- Gene Austin (1900–1972), American singer-songwriter
- Gene Clark (1944–1991), American singer, songwriter, founding member of the band The Byrds
- Eugen Doga (1937–2025), Moldovan composer
- Wendell Eugene (1923–2017), American jazz musician
- Eugene Aynsley Goossens (1893–1962), English conductor and composer
- Eugène Goossens, fils (1867–1958), French conductor and violinist
- Eugène Goossens, père (1845–1906), Belgian conductor
- Eugene Hütz (born 1972), Ukrainian-American singer, composer, disc jockey and actor, frontman of the band Gogol Bordello
- Eugene Izotov (born 1973), Russian-American oboist
- Gene Krupa (1909–1973), American jazz and big band drummer
- Gene McDaniels (1935–2011), American singer-songwriter
- Eugene Ormandy (1899–1985), Hungarian-born conductor
- Eugene Pao (fl. 2000s–2010s), Hong Kong jazz guitarist
- Gene Puerling (1929–2008), vocal arranger, leader of The Hi-Lo's and The Singers Unlimited
- Gene Simmons (born 1949), bassist and co-lead singer of rock band Kiss
- Gene Taylor (1929–2001), American jazz double bassist
- Eugene Tzigane (fl. 2000s–2020s), Japanese-American conductor
- Gene Vincent (1935–1971), American rock-and-roll musician
- Eugene Wilde (born 1961), American R&B singer
- Eugene Wright (1923–2020), American jazz bassist, member of the Dave Brubeck Quartet
- Eugène Ysaÿe (1858–1931), Belgian violinist, composer and conductor

=== Literature ===
- Eugene Field (1850–1895), American writer, columnist and children's poet
- Eugène Ionesco (1909–1994), Romanian-French playwright and dramatist
- Eugène Marin Labiche (1815–1888), French dramatist
- Eugène Lanti (1879–1947), French Esperantist, socialist and writer
- Eugène Marais (1871–1936), South African writer and poet
- Eugene O'Neill (1888–1953), American playwright
- Eugène Edine Pottier (1816–1887), French revolutionary socialist, poet, and transport worker
- Eugene Trivizas (born 1946), Greek author

=== Art ===
- Eugène Broerman (1861–1932), Belgian painter
- Eugène Boudin (1824–1898), French painter
- Eugène Carrière (1849–1906), French symbolist
- Eugène Delacroix (1798–1863), French painter
- Eugène Grasset (1845–1917), Swiss decorative artist of the Belle Epoque
- Eugène Jansson (1852–1915), Swedish painter
- Eugene Lambert (1928–2010), Irish puppeteer
- Eugene Pandala (born 1954), Indian architect
- Eugene Oliver Palmer (born 1955), Jamaican-born British artist
- Evgenios Spatharis (1924–2009), Greek shadow theatre artist
- Eugene Tapahe (born 1967), Navajo photographer
- Eugene V. Thaw (1927–2018), American art dealer and collector

=== Politics ===
- Eugène Koffi Adoboli (1934–2025), Togolese politician
- Eugene H. Belden (1840–1910), Michigan politician
- Eugene "Geno" Chiarelli (born 1994), West Virginian state delegate
- Eugene V. Debs (1855–1926), American socialist
- Eugene Reginald de Fonseka (died 2003), puisne judge of the Supreme Court of Sri Lanka
- Eugène Heijnen (born 1964), Dutch politician and tax consultant
- Eugene D. Lujan (1887–1980), justice of the New Mexico Supreme Court
- Eugene McCarthy (1916–2005), U.S. senator from Minnesota
- Eugene McGehee (1929–2014), Louisiana politician
- Eugene Mitchell (1866–1944), American lawyer and president of the Atlanta Board of Education
- Eugène Paquet (1867–1951), Canadian parliamentarian
- Eugene E. Pratt (c. 1892–1970), justice of the Utah Supreme Court
- Eugène Ruffy (1854–1919), Swiss politician
- Eugene Sawyer (1934–2008), American businessman and politician
- Eugène Terre'Blanche (1941–2010), South African right-wing politician and leader of the AWB

=== Sports ===
- Eugene Asante (born 2001), American football player
- Eugene German (born 1997), American basketball player
- Eugene Glazer (fencer) (born 1939), American Olympic fencer
- Eugene Galekovic (born 1981), Australian goalkeeper
- Eugène Chaboud (1907–1983), Formula One driver from France
- Eugène Christophe (1885–1970), French professional cyclist
- Eugene Laverty (born 1986), Irish professional motorcyclist
- Eugene Lawrence (born 1986), American professional basketball player
- Eugene Selznick (1930–2012), American volleyball player
- Eugene Sseppuya (born 1983), Ugandan football striker
- Gene Cockrell (1934–2020), American football player
- Gene Filipski (1931–1994), American football player
- Gene Moore (outfielder) (1909–1978), right fielder in Major League Baseball
- Gene Moore (pitcher) (1886–1938), left-handed pitcher in Major League Baseball
- Gene Okerlund (1942–2019), American professional wrestling announcer
- Gene Prebola (1938–2021), American football player
- Geno Smith (born 1990), American football player
- Gene Snitsky (born 1970), American professional wrestler who formerly performed for World Wrestling Entertainment
- Gene Upshaw (1945–2008), American football player, labor leader, and former NFL Players Association director

=== Sciences ===
- Eugène Michel Antoniadi (1870–1944), Greek astronomer
- Eugen Bleuler (1857–1939), Swiss psychiatrist who coined the terms schizophrenia and autism
- Eugene Braunwald (1929–2026), Austrian-born American cardiologist
- Eugène Charles Catalan (1814–1894), Belgian mathematician
- Eugene Cernan (1934–2017), American astronaut, eleventh person to walk on the Moon
- Eugene Chelyshev (1921–2020), Russian indologist
- Eugene Cussons (1979–2026), South African primatologist
- Eugène Joseph Delporte (1882–1955), Belgian astronomer
- Eugene V. Gallagher (born 1950), American religious scholar
- Eugene Goodilin (born 1969), Russian material scientist
- Eugene Gu (born 1986), American physician-scientist
- Eugene Guth (1905–1990), Hungarian-American theoretical physicist
- Eugene Lazowski (1913–2006), Polish doctor who saved 8,000 people by creating a fake typhus epidemic in World War II
- Eugene Parker (1927–2022), American solar and plasma physicist, after which the Parker Solar Probe was named
- Eugène Schueller (1881–1957), French chemist, entrepreneur and founder of L'Oréal
- Eugene Merle Shoemaker (1928–1997), American astronomer and geologist
- Eugène Simon (1848–1924), French arachnologist
- Eugène Soubeiran (1797–1859), French scientist who served as chief pharmacist at the Pitié-Salpêtrière Hospital
- Eugene Stanley (born 1941), American physicist
- Eugene Ulrich (born 1938), American Dead Sea Scrolls scholar
- Eugene Wigner (1902–1995), Hungarian-American theoretical physicist and winner of Nobel Prize in Physics in 1963

=== Other professions ===
- Eugene Allen (1919–2010), White House butler
- Eugene Burger (1939–2017), American magician and author
- Gene Gotti (born 1946), Italian-American mobster
- Eugene Jarvis (fl. 1970s–2020s), American computer games designer and programmer
- Eugene de Kock (born 1949), South African policeman serving a life sentence
- Gene Kranz (born 1933), NASA Flight Director
- Eugène Minkowski (1885–1972), French psychiatrist
- Eugene Murtagh (born 1942), Irish billionaire businessman, founder of Kingspan Group
- Eugene K. Palmer (born 1939) American fugitive
- Eugene Roshal (born 1972), Russian software engineer, developer of RAR and WinRAR
- Eugene Skinner (1809–1864), American pioneer, founder of Eugene, Oregon
- Eugene Stoner (1922–1997), American firearms designer, who designed M16 rifle
- Eugene Tan (born 1970), Singapore political analyst and law lecturer
- Eugene Thuraisingam (born 1975), Singaporean criminal lawyer
- Eugène Viollet-le-Duc (1814–1879), French architect
- Eugene Lee Yang (born 1986), American filmmaker, actor, author, and internet celebrity

== Fictional characters ==
- Gene Belcher, a main character in the animated series Bob's Burgers
- Eugene Chaud, in Mega Man Battle Network
- Eugene Dix, in Final Destination 2
- Eugene Fitzherbert, in Tangled
- Eugene Horowitz, in Hey Arnold! media
- Eugene H. Krabs, in SpongeBob SquarePants media
- Eugene Meltsner, in the Adventures in Odyssey series
- Eugene Onegin, the title character in Alexander Pushkin's novel and in Tchaikovsky's eponymous opera
- Eugene Pontecorvo, a character on The Sopranos
- Eugene (Pokémon) or Eusine, in Pokémon media
- Eugene Tackleberry in the Police Academy franchise
- Eugene "Flash" Thompson, in the Spider-Man comics
- Eugene Young, in The Practice

== See also ==
- Eugene (disambiguation)
- Eugen
- Eugenio
- Eugenios
- Eugenius, Western Roman emperor
- Eugenia (name)
- Kevin, a name of Irish origin with a similar meaning
