= Indian Genetic Disease Database =

Disease Database in India

Content
- Description: Biodatabase

Contact
- Research center: Indian Institute of Chemical Biology, (IICB) (CSIR)
- Laboratory: Structural Biology and Bioinformatics Division
- Authors: Sanchari Pradhan
- Primary citation: Pradhan et al.
- Release date: 30 October 2010

Access
- Website: http://bioinfo.jisiasr.org/igdd/

Indian Genetic Disease Database (IGDD) is the first patient-based genetic disease database in India. It is developed and maintained at Indian Institute of Chemical Biology (IICB), a unit of the Council of Scientific and Industrial Research.

The first version of the database was published online. It is divided into 19 disease categories, including Blood Related Disorders, Bone and Joints Related Growth Disorders, Eye Disorders, Gastro-Intestinal Disorders, Hearing Disorders, Lysosomal Disorders, Multi-system Disorders, Muscle Related Disorders, Neurological Disorders, Pigmentary Disorders, and Skin Related Disorders.

This database keeps track of mutations in the causal genes for that genetic diseases common in India. The database will be helpful to physicians, geneticists, researchers, and other professionals in India and abroad related to genetic disorders to retrieve and use the information for the benefit of mankind.

== Features ==
The database was launched in August 2010. It holds patient-based data with respect to the geographical location, age, sex, and ethnic group. Disease incidence can be compared with other regions. The mode of inheritance of a particular disease is also recorded.

Each disease is represented with gene name, chromosome location, mutations, and geospatial distribution.

The first version of the database covered 52 diseases with information on 5,760 individuals. It later expanded to 109 genetic diseases.

== Achievements ==
The Publication was selected as a featured article in Nucleic Acid Research in 2011.

== Submission ==
Patient-specific mutation information can be entered online.

== JIS Institute of Advanced Studies and Research (JISIASR) ==
A copy of the IGDD database is hosted at JISIASR (http://jisiasr.org/). The IGDD can be accessed through [this link](http://bioinfo.jisiasr.org/igdd/).

== IGDD2 ==
A more advanced version, IGDD2, is currently under development and its alpha release is available [here](http://bioinfo.jisiasr.org/igdd2/).
