= Eugene Goodilin =

- Born: November 1969 (age 56)
- Education: Faculty of Chemistry, Moscow State University
- Scientific career
- Fields: Chemistry, Material science
- Workplaces: Material Science Department and Faculty of Chemistry, Moscow State University
- Thesis: (1995)

Eugene Goodilin (Russian: Евгений Алексеевич Гудилин; born 18 November 1969) is a Russian chemist and material scientist.

== Biography ==
In 2006 was elected in the Russian Academy of Science and became the youngest corresponding member.

In 2015, a group of researchers from Lomonosov Moscow State University under the direction of Goodilin developed a unique method of performing nondestructive analysis of the electron transport chain in living mitochondria, using surface-enhanced Raman spectroscopy. Their work in this area was published in the journal Scientific Reports.
