= Yu-jin =

- Hangul: 유진
- RR: Yujin
- MR: Yujin

Yu-jin, also spelled Yoo-jin, is a Korean given name. The name is popular as not only is it a traditional Korean name but it can be romanized as Eugene, allowing children to have not only a name that is Korean in origin but easy for Westerners to pronounce. In the early 2000s, Yu-jin was among the most popular names for baby boys, but later in the decade, it saw a fall in popularity, and by 2008 Yu-jin had fallen out of the top ten.

== People ==
People with this name include:

=== Sportspeople ===
- Kim Yoo-jin (footballer, born 1981), South Korean female footballer
- Kim Yoo-jin (footballer, born 1983), South Korean male football player
- Jeong You-jin (born 1983), South Korean male sport shooter
- Lim Yu-jin (born 1983), South Korean female volleyball player
- Ji Yoo-jin (born 1988), South Korean female rower
- Hong Yoo-jin (born 1989), South Korean female field hockey player
- Choi Yu-jin (figure skater) (born 2000), South Korean female figure skater
- Jang Yu-jin (born 2001), South Korean female freestyle skier

=== Film and television actors ===
- Ryu Jin (born Im Yu-jin, 1972), South Korean actor
- Eugene (actress) (born Kim Yoo-jin, 1981), South Korean actress and idol singer, member of S.E.S.
- So Yoo-jin (born 1981), South Korean actress
- Uee (born Kim Yu-jin, 1988), South Korean actress and idol singer
- Jung Yoo-jin (born 1989), South Korean actress
- Eugene Lee Yang (born 1986), American comedian and member of The Try Guys

=== Singers ===
- Lee Yoo-jin (actress) (born 1977), South Korean female actress and model
- H-Eugene (born Heo Yu-jin, 1979), South Korean male recording artist
- Neon Bunny (born Im Yujin, 1983), South Korean singer-songwriter
- Eyedi (born Nam Yu-jin, 1995), South Korean female singer-songwriter
- Choi Yu-jin (born 1996), South Korean female singer, member of CLC and leader of Kep1er
- An Yu-jin (born 2003), South Korean female singer, leader of Ive, former member of Iz*One
- Bailey Sok (Korean name Sok Yu-jin, born 2004), American female dancer and member of AllDay Project

=== Other ===
- Kim Yoo-jin (director) (born 1950), South Korean male director
- Yoojin Grace Wuertz (born 1980), South Korean-born American female novelist
- Kim Yoo-jin (StarCraft player) (born 1993), South Korean male professional StarCraft II player

== Fictional characters ==
Fictional characters with this name include:

- Jung Yoo-jin, in 2002 South Korean television series Winter Sonata
- Choi Yu-Jin (Eugene Choi), in 2018 South Korean television series Mr. Sunshine
- Yun-Jin Lee, in Dead by Daylight DLC - All Kill Chapter
- Lee Yu-Jin, in 2021 South Korean drama Imitation

== See also ==
- Eugene Group, South Korean chaebol with business interests in construction, media, and other industries
