= Eugen =

Male given name

Eugen is a masculine given name which may refer to:

- Archduke Eugen of Austria (1863–1954), last Habsburg Grandmaster of the Teutonic Order from 1894 to 1923
- Prince Eugen, Duke of Närke (1865–1947), Swedish painter, art collector, and patron of artists
- Prince Eugen of Schaumburg-Lippe (1899–1929)
- Prince Eugen of Bavaria (1925–1997)
- Eugen Aburel (1899–1975), Romanian surgeon and obstetrician
- Eugen Bacon, female African-Australian author
- Eugen Beza (born 1978), Romanian football manager and former player
- Eugen Bleuler (1857–1939), Swiss psychiatrist and eugenicist
- Eugen von Böhm-Bawerk (1851–1914), Austrian economist
- Eugen Bolz (1881–1945), German politician and member of the anti-Nazi resistance
- Eugen Chirnoagă (1891–1965), Romanian chemist
- Eugen Cicero (1940–1997), Romanian-German jazz pianist
- Eugen Ciucă (1913–2005), Romanian-American artist
- Eugen Constant (1890–1975), Romanian writer and trade unionist
- Eugen d'Albert (1864–1932), Scottish-born pianist and composer
- Eugen Doga (born 1937), Romanian composer from Moldova
- Eugen Drewermann (born 1940), German church critic, theologian, peace activist, and former Catholic priest
- Eugen Dühring (1833–1921), German philosopher, positivist, economist and socialist
- Eugen Fischer (1874–1967), German professor of medicine, anthropology, and eugenics and Nazi
- Eugen Fischer (historian) (1899–1973), German geologist and historian
- Eugen Gerstenmaier (1906–1986), German Protestant theologian, resistance fighter, and politician, president of the Bundestag (1954–1969)
- Eugen Goldstein (1850–1930), German Jewish physicist working with discharge tubes
- Eugen Gomringer (1925–2025), Bolivian-born Swiss concrete poet
- Eugen Grimminger (1892–1986), a member of the anti-Nazi White Rose resistance group in Germany
- Eugen Peter Jeljenic, birth name of Gene Rayburn (1917–1999), American gameshow host and radio personality
- Eugen Jochum (1902–1987), German conductor
- Eugen Landau (1852–1935), German Jewish banker and philanthropist
- Eugen Leviné (1883–1919), German Jewish communist revolutionary and one of the leaders of the short-lived Bavarian Council Republic
- Eugen Netto (1848–1919), German mathematician
- Eugen Nosko (born 1938), German photographer
- Eugen J. Pentiuc (born 1955), Romanian biblical scholar
- Eugen Richter (1838–1906), German politician in Imperial Germany
- Eugen Rochko (born Evgeniy Rochko, Russian: Евгений Рочко; 1993–), Russian-born German creator of the Mastodon (social network)
- Eugen Rosenstock-Huessy (1888–1973), German Jewish historian and social philosopher
- Eugen Sandow (1867–1925), Prussian bodybuilder and showman born Friedrich Wilhelm Müller
- Eugen Sänger (1905–1964), Austrian aerospace engineer
- Eugen Schauman (1875–1904), Swedish-speaking Finnish nationalist, nobleman, and assassin
- Eugen Schileru (1916–1968), Romanian art and literary critic, essayist, and translator
- Eugen Seiler (born 1984), German politician
- Eugen Simion (1933–2022), Romanian literary critic, historian, and academician
- Eugén Strömberg (1895–1971), Swedish military doctor
- Eugen Šváb (1936–2024), Slovak swing musician
- Eugen Trică (born 1976), Romanian football manager and former player
- Eugen Țurcanu (1925–1954), Romanian communist criminal and torturer
- Eugen Weidmann (1908–1939), German criminal and serial killer, last person publicly executed in France
- Eugen Zasavițchi (born 1992), Moldovan footballer

== See also ==
- Eugene (given name)
