= MSU Department of Materials Science =

Coordinates: 55°42′17″N 37°31′09″E

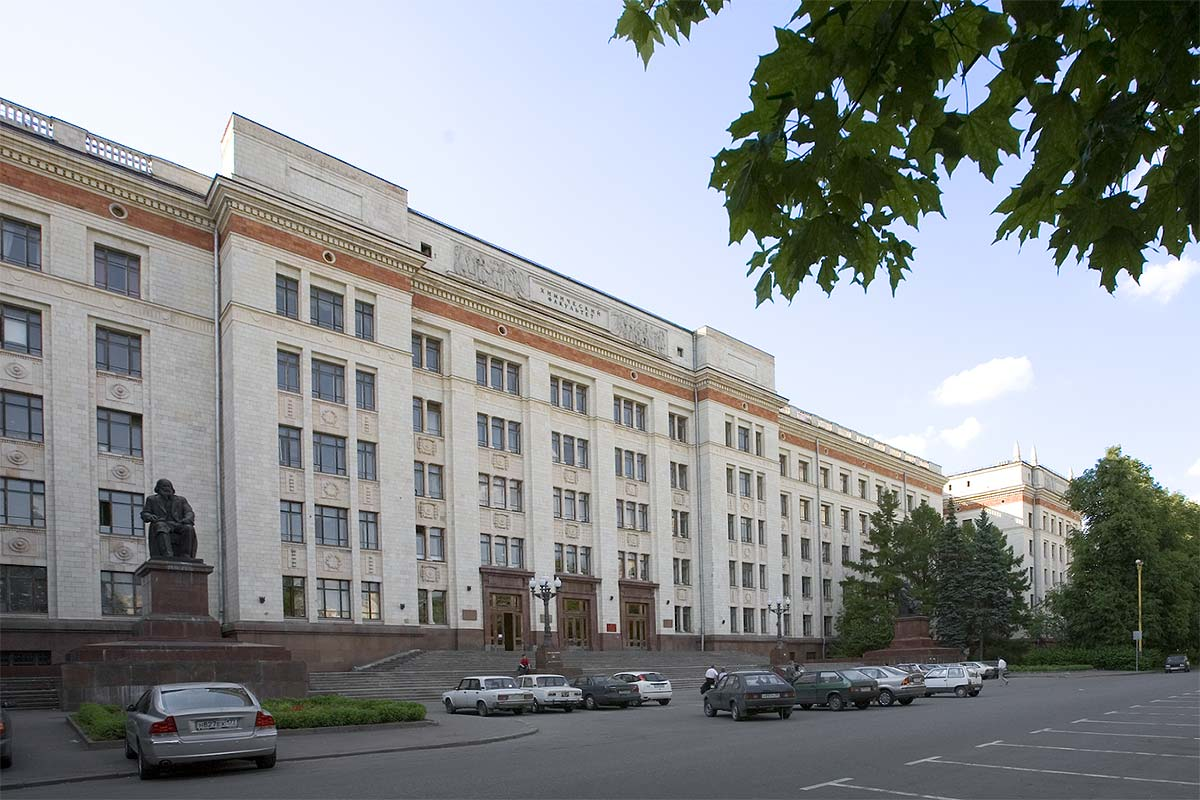
Chemistry Department, Moscow State University

The Moscow State University Materials Science Department (Russian: Факультет наук о материалах МГУ) is a faculty of Moscow State University, founded in 1991 at the base of the Faculty of Chemistry, Faculty of Physics and Faculty of Mechanics and Mathematics. The former name of the structure was High School of Materials Science (Высший колледж наук о материалах).

As of 2010 about 150 students studied at the faculty. Although the faculty is relatively small, the faculty includes members of Russian Academy of Sciences (RAS) among its members. The educational program of the faculty includes mathematics, physics, chemistry and mechanics, and also number of practical courses.

The faculty annually accepts 25 new students. The education lasts 5.5 years (11 semesters) for Specialist degree, or 4 years for Bachelor's degree and 2 more years for Master's degree. The 1st dean and founder of the department is Yury Dmitrievich Tretyakov.
