= Moscow State University =

Public research university in Moscow, Russia

M. V. Lomonosov Moscow State University
- Московский государственный университет имени М. В. Ломоносова
- Logo of Moscow State University
- Former name: Imperial Moscow University
- Motto: Наука есть ясное познание истины, просвещение разума
- Motto in English: Science is clear knowledge of the truth, enlightenment of the mind Scientia est clara cognitio veritatis, illustratio mentis (Latin)
- Type: Public research university
- Established: 23 January 1755; 271 years ago
- Founders: Mikhail Vasilyevich Lomonosov and Ivan Shuvalov
- Affiliations: Association of Professional Schools of International Affairs (cancelled in 2022); Institutional Network of the Universities from the Capitals of Europe (suspended in 2022); International Forum of Public Universities
- Rector: Viktor Sadovnichiy
- Academic staff: 5,000
- Students: 39,282
- Location: Moscow, Russia; 55.7039°N 37.5286°E
- Campus: Urban
- Language: Russian
- Colors
- Website: msu.ru/en/
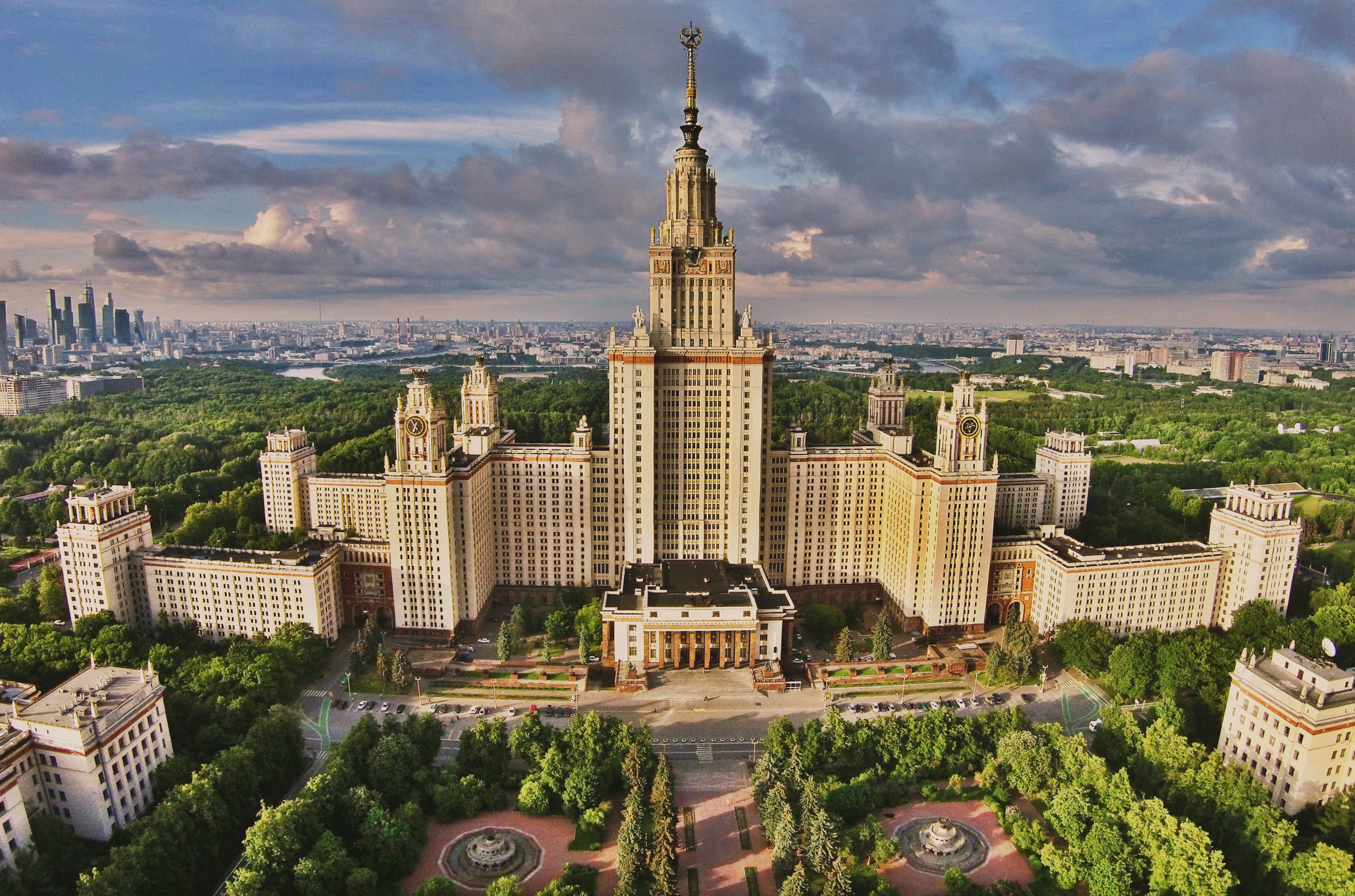

- Location within Moscow

General information
- Completed: 1953

Height
- Architectural: 240 m (787 ft)
- Top floor: 214 m (702 ft)

Technical details
- Floor count: 42
- Floor area: 1,000,000 m^{2} (10,763,910.417 sq ft)

Website
- msu.ru/en/

Moscow State University (MSU), officially M. V. Lomonosov Moscow State University, (Note: Russian: Московский государственный университет имени М. В. Ломоносова, romanized: Moskovskiy gosudarstvennyy universitet imeni M. V. Lomonosova, IPA: [mɐˈskofskʲɪj ɡəsʊˈdarstvʲɪn(ː)ɨj ʊnʲɪvʲɪrsʲɪˈtʲet ˈimʲɪnʲɪ ɛmˈvɛ ləmɐˈnosəvə].) is a public research university in Moscow, Russia. The university includes 15 research institutes, 43 faculties, more than 300 departments, and six branches. Alumni of the university include past leaders of the Soviet Union and other governments. As of 2019, 13 Nobel laureates, 6 Fields Medal winners, and 1 Turing Award winner were affiliated with the university.

== History ==
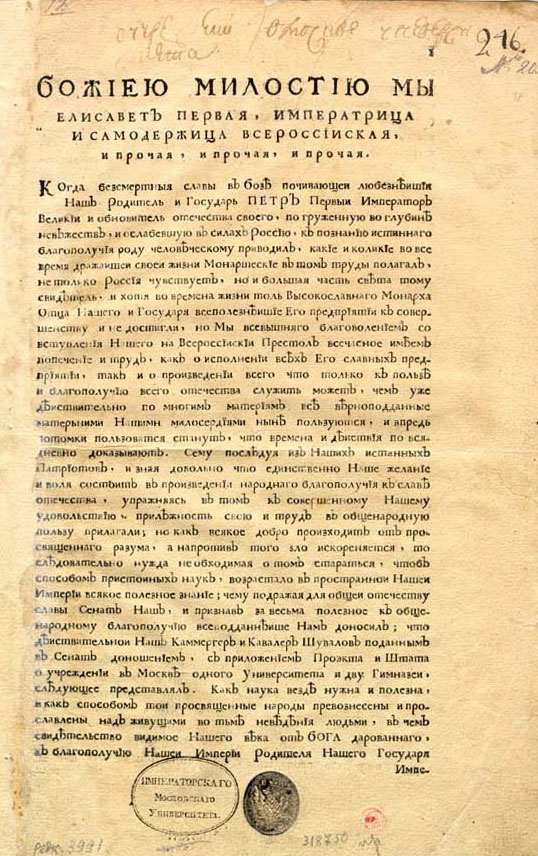
Decree on the foundation of the Moscow State University

=== Imperial Moscow University ===
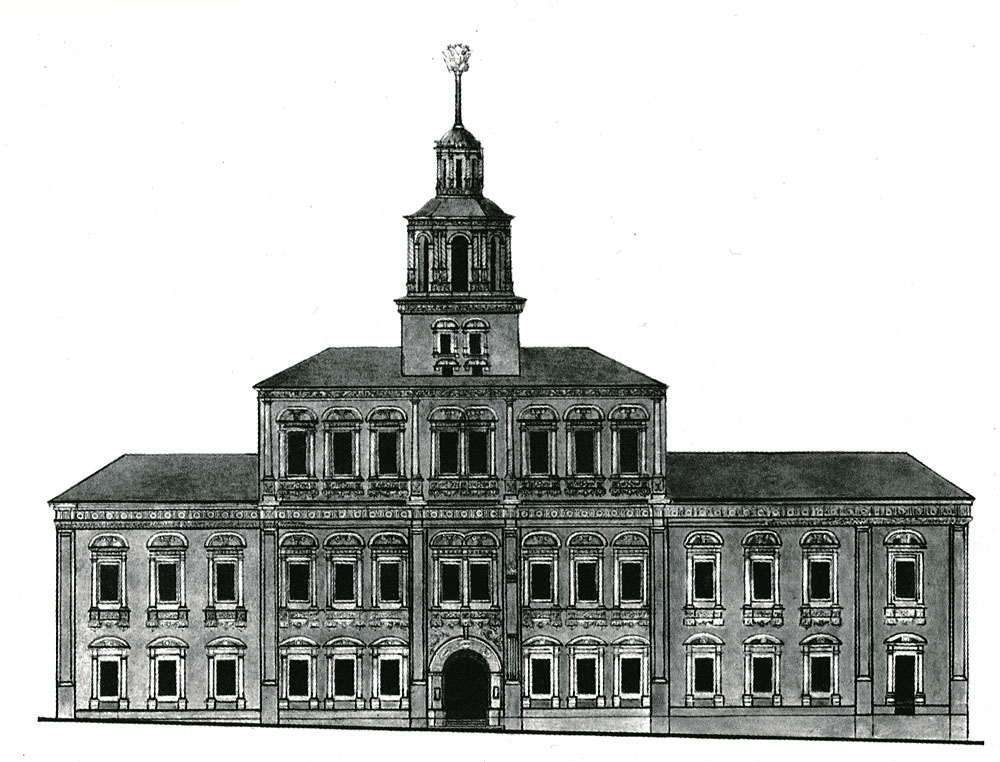
The Principal Medicine Store building on Red Square that housed Moscow University from 1755 to 1787

Ivan Shuvalov and Mikhail Lomonosov promoted the idea of a university in Moscow, and Russian Empress Elizabeth decreed its establishment on 23 January [O.S. 12 January] 1755.

The first lectures were given on 7 May [O.S. 26 April]. Saint Petersburg State University and MSU each claim to be Russia's oldest university. Though Moscow State University was founded in 1755, St. Petersburg which has had a continuous existence as a "university" since 1819 sees itself as the successor of an academy established on in 1724, by a decree of Peter the Great.

MSU originally occupied the Principal Medicine Store on Red Square from 1755 to 1787. Catherine the Great transferred the university to a building on the other side of Mokhovaya Street, constructed between 1782 and 1793, to a design by Matvei Kazakov, and rebuilt by Domenico Giliardi after fire consumed much of Moscow in 1812.

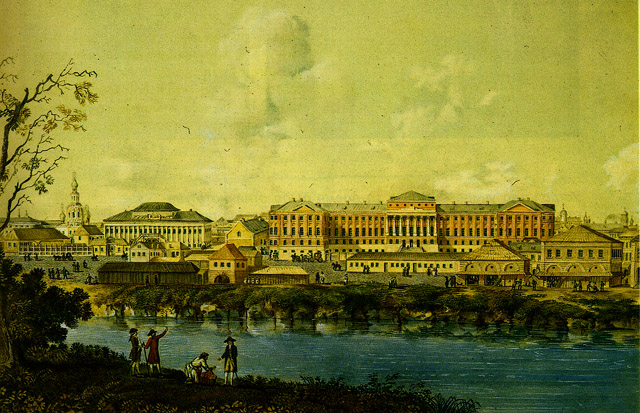
Main buildings of the university in Mokhovaya Street, 1798

In the 18th century, the university had three departments: philosophy, medicine, and law. A preparatory college was affiliated with the university until its abolition in 1812. In 1779, Mikhail Kheraskov founded a boarding school for noblemen (Благородный пансион) which in 1830 became a gymnasium for Russian nobility. The university press, run by Nikolay Novikov in the 1780s, published the newspaper in Imperial Russia: Moskovskie Vedomosti.

In 1804, medical education split into clinical (therapy), surgical, and obstetrics faculties. Between 1884 and 1897, the Department of Medicine built a medical campus in Devichye Pole, between the Garden Ring and Novodevichy Convent; designed by Konstantin Bykovsky, with university doctors like Nikolay Sklifosovskiy and Fyodor Erismann acting as consultants. The campus, and medical education in general, were separated from Moscow University in 1930. Devichye Pole was operated by the independent I.M. Sechenov First Moscow State Medical University and by various other state and private institutions.

The roots of student unrest in the university reach deep into the nineteenth century. In 1905, a social-democratic organization emerged at the university and called for the overthrow of the Czarist government and the establishment of a republic in Russia. The imperial government repeatedly threatened to close the university. In 1911, in a protest over the introduction of troops onto the campus and mistreatment of certain professors, 130 scientists and professors resigned en masse, including Nikolay Dimitrievich Zelinskiy, Pyotr Nikolaevich Lebedev, and Sergei Alekseevich Chaplygin; thousands of students were expelled.

=== Moscow State University ===
==== 1917–1949 ====
After the October Revolution of 1917, the institution began to admit children of the proletariat and peasantry. In 1919, the university abolished tuition fees, and established a preparatory facility to help working-class children prepare for entrance examinations. During the implementation of Joseph Stalin's first five-year plan (1928–32), the university was expanded.

==== 1950–1999 ====
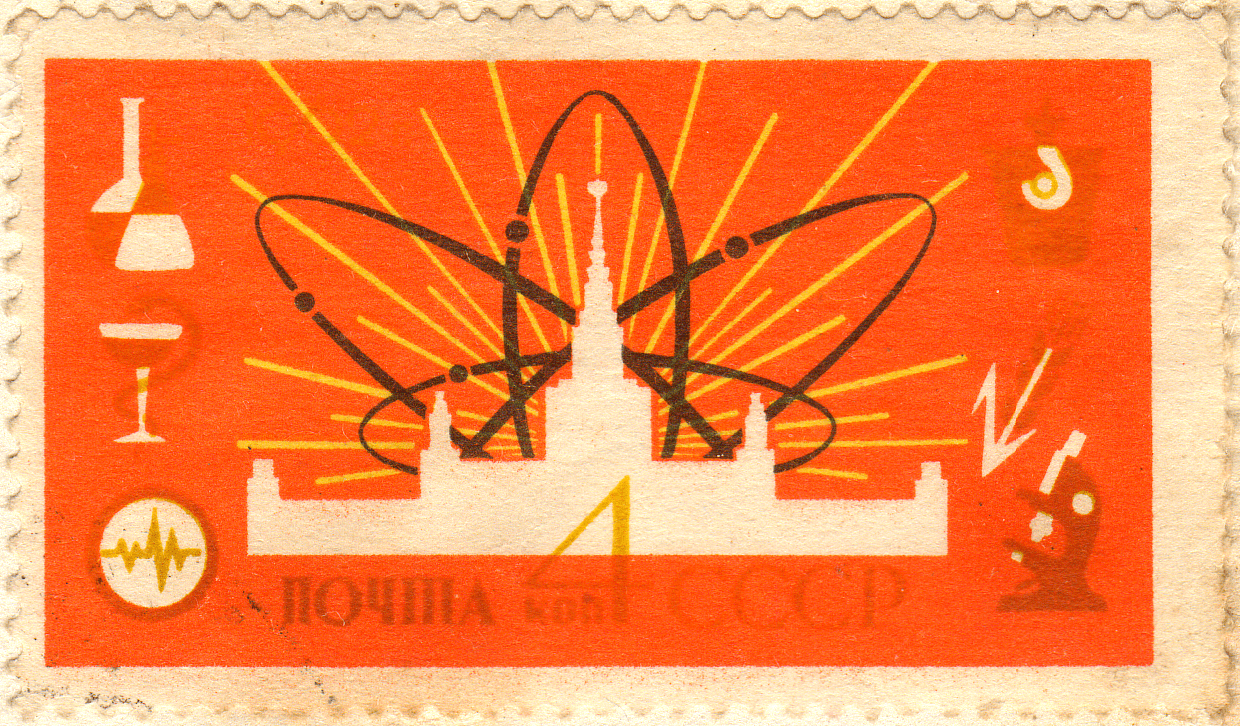
A 1962 Soviet stamp features Moscow State University.

A 2014 article entitled "Math as a tool of anti-semitism" in The Mathematics Enthusiast discussed antisemitism in the Moscow State University's Department of Mathematics during the 1970s and 1980s.

In the mid-1980s, the Dean of MSU's law faculty was dismissed for taking bribes. After 1991, nine new faculties were established. The following year, the university gained a unique status: it is funded directly from the state budget (bypassing the Ministry of Education).

On 6 September 1997, French electronic musician Jean Michel Jarre used the front of the university as the backdrop for a concert. The concert attracted a paying crowd of half a million people.

==== 2000–2020 ====
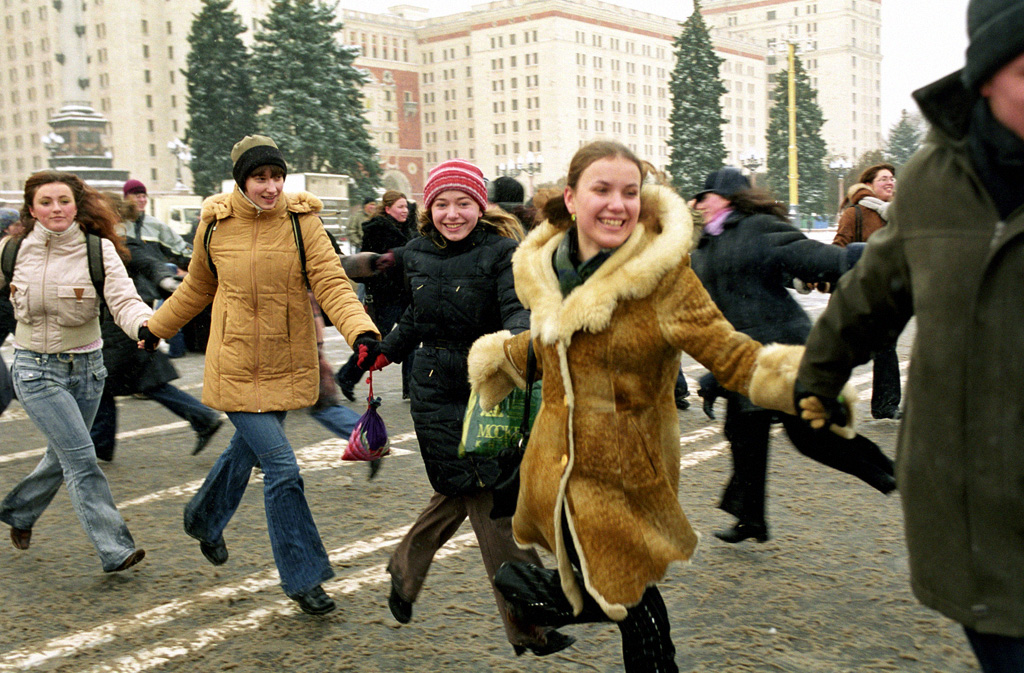
Students celebrating the 250th anniversary of the university in 2005

In 2007, MSU Rector Viktor Sadovnichy said that corruption in Russia's education system was a "systemic illness," and that he had seen an ad guaranteeing a perfect score on entrance exams to MSU, for a significant fee.

On 19 March 2008, Russia's most powerful supercomputer to date, the SKIF MSU (Russian: СКИФ МГУ; skif means 'Scythian' in Russian) was launched at the university. Its peak performance of 60 TFLOPS (LINPACK – 47.170 TFLOPS) made it the fastest supercomputer in the Commonwealth of Independent States.

In November 2012, Mikhail Basharatyan, Deputy Dean of the MSU World Economy Department, was fired for taking a bribe from a pupil. In February 2013, Andrei Andriyanov resigned as head of the Kolmogorov Special Educational and Scientific Center of the university, after an investigation concluded that he had included fake references in his doctoral thesis.

==== 2020–present ====
In March 2022, Victor Sadovnichy, rector of Moscow State University and president of the Russian Union of Rectors, was the lead signature in a public statement endorsing the 2022 Russian invasion of Ukraine. In reaction, Academia Europaea, a pan-European academy, suspended the membership of Sadovnichy. In response to the Russian invasion, that same month Yale University, the Hamburg University of Applied Sciences, University of Potsdam, and HKU Business School suspended their longstanding relationships with the university, and the University of St Andrews suspended a joint master's degree programme with the university. Intel and AMD, the largest chip manufacturers in the world, whose processors are used in the Moscow State University supercomputer, as well as Nvidia, reacted by suspending deliveries of their processors to Russia.

== Campus ==
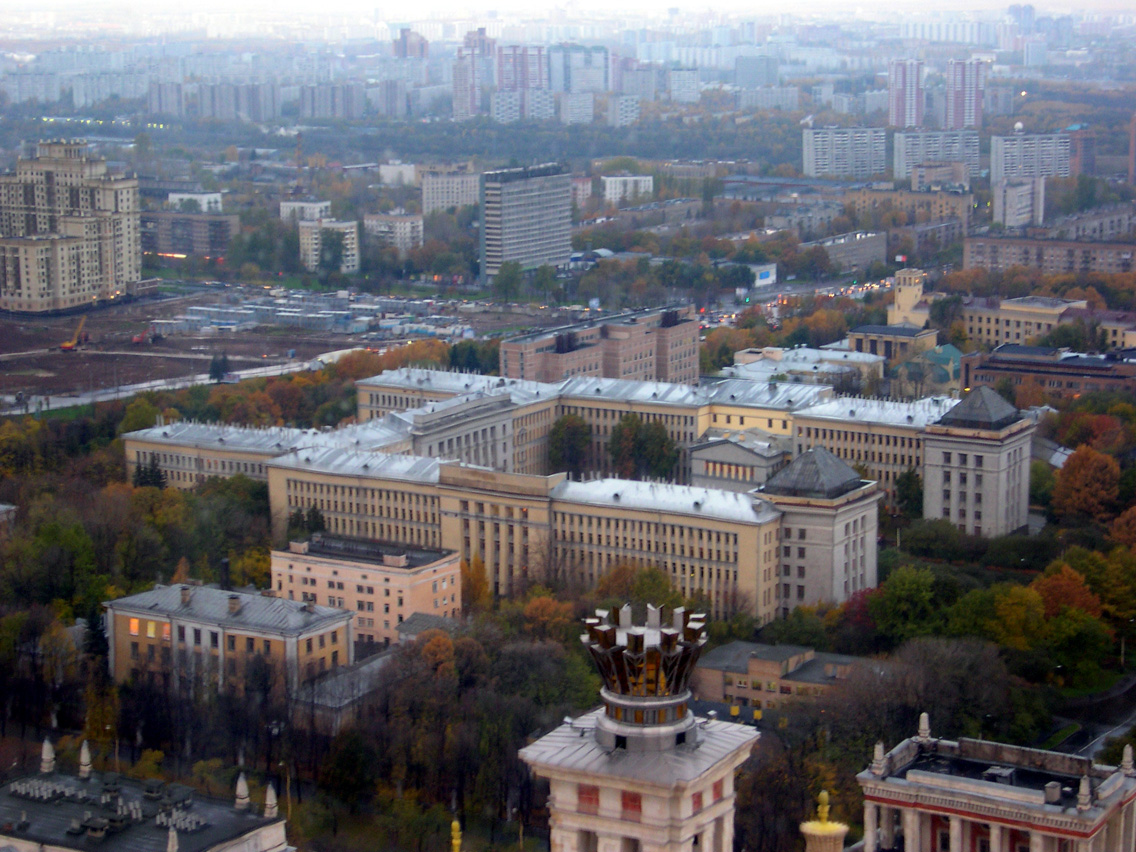
Building of the Faculties of Biology and of Soil Science

Since 1953, most of the faculties have been situated on Sparrow Hills, in southwest Moscow. In the post-war era, Joseph Stalin ordered seven tiered neoclassic towers to be built around the city. It was built using Gulag labour, as were many of Stalin's Great Construction Projects in Russia. The MSU main building was the tallest building in Europe until 1990. The central tower is 240 m tall, 36 stories high.

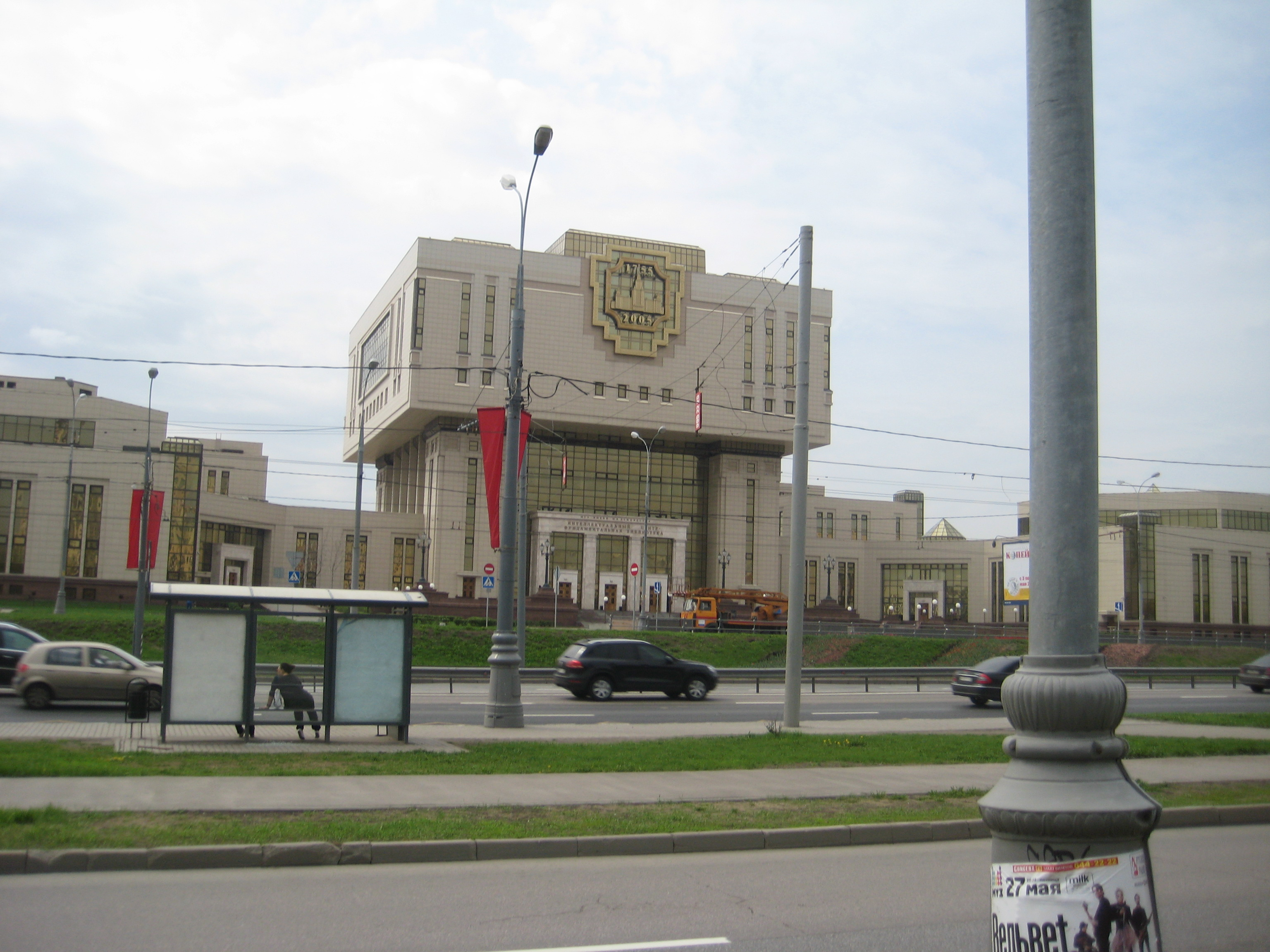
The university library

Along with the university administration, the Museum of Earth Sciences and faculties of Mechanics and Mathematics, Geology, Geography, and Fine and Performing Arts are in the main building. The building on Mokhovaya Street houses the Faculty of Journalism, the Faculty of Psychology, and Institute of Asian and African Countries. A number of faculty buildings are located near Manege Square in the centre of Moscow and a number of campuses abroad in Ukraine, Kazakhstan, Tajikistan and Uzbekistan. The Ulyanovsk branch of MSU was reorganized into Ulyanovsk State University in 1996.

== Faculties ==
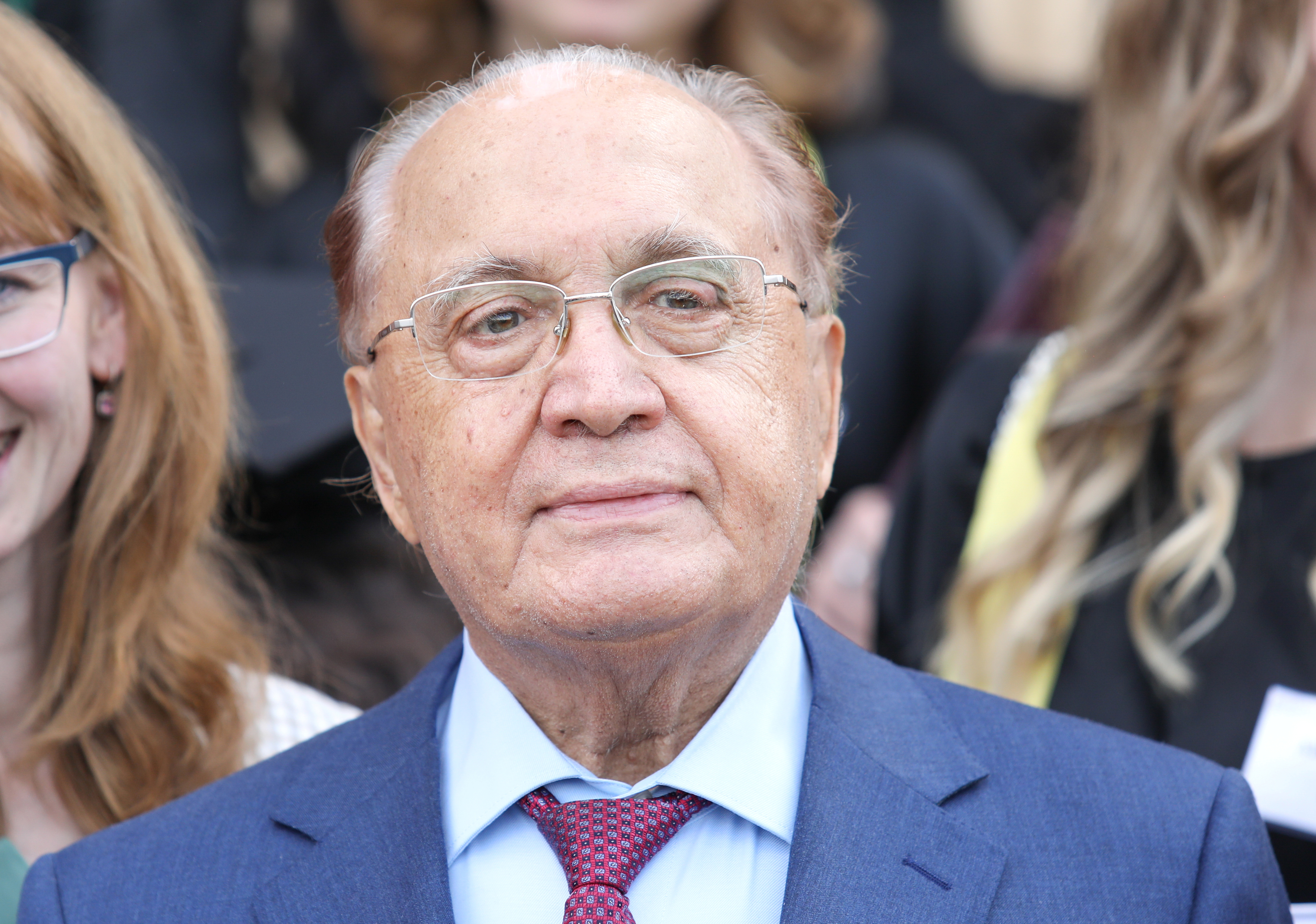
Rector Viktor Sadovnichiy

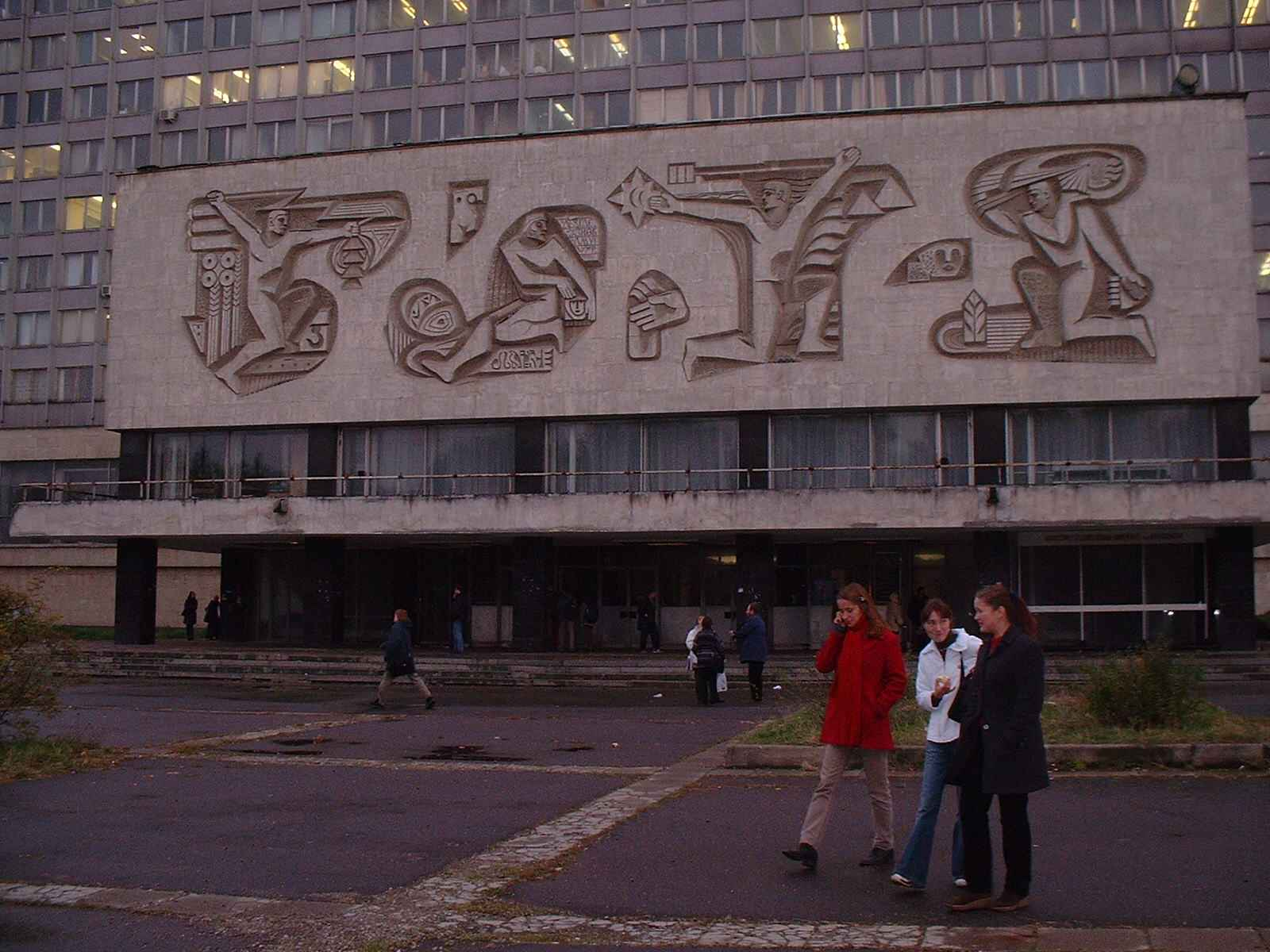
The first Humanities Building

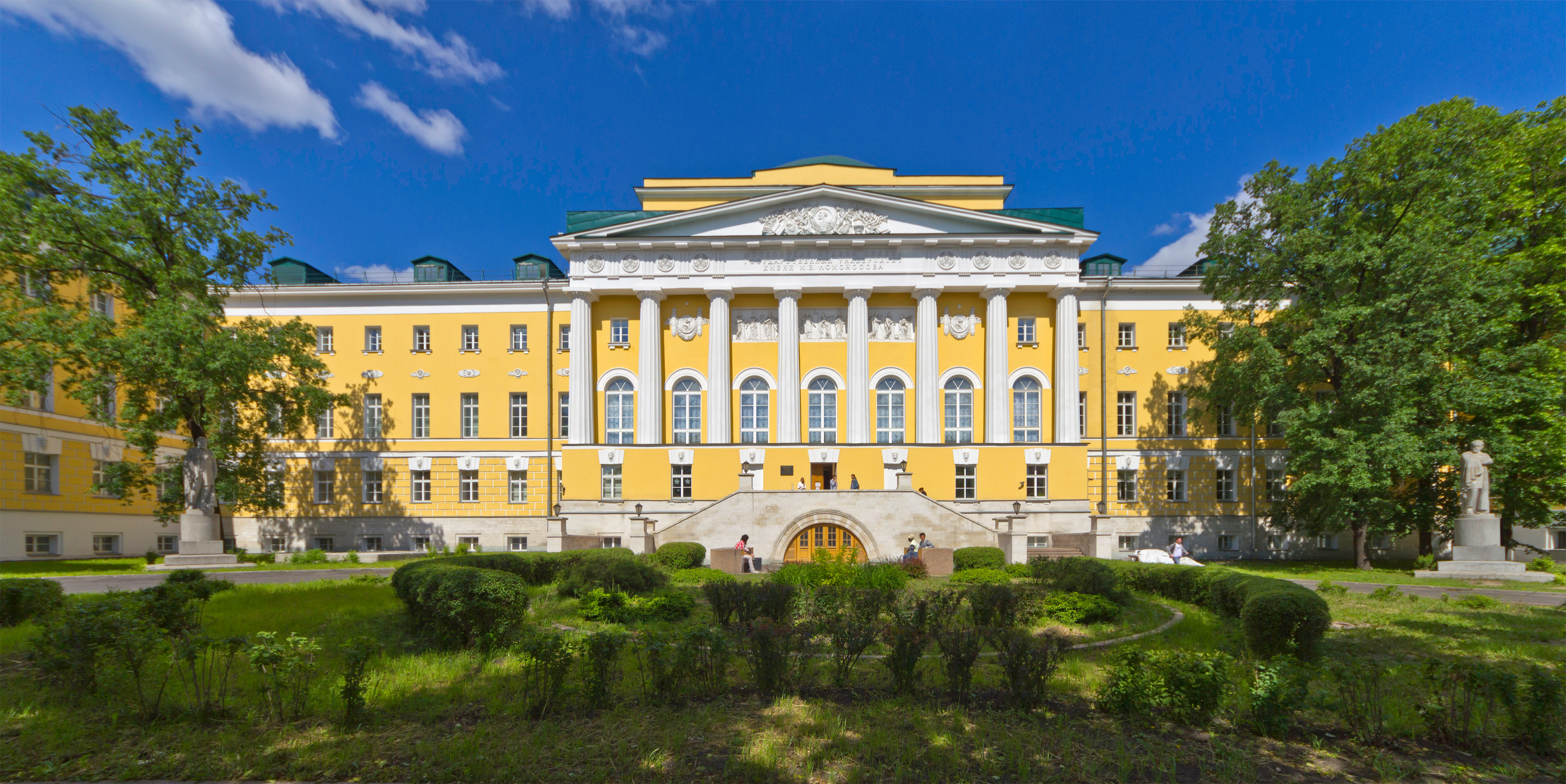
As of 2015, the Old Building housed the Department of Oriental studies.

As of 2009, the university had 39 faculties and 15 research centres. A number of small faculties opened, such as Faculty of Physics and Chemistry and Higher School of Television. The full list of faculties is as follows:

- Faculty of Mechanics and Mathematics
- Faculty of Computational Mathematics and Cybernetics
- Faculty of Physics
- Faculty of Chemistry
- Faculty of Materials Science
- Faculty of Biology
- Faculty of Bioengineering and Bioinformatics
- Faculty of Soil Science
- Faculty of Geology
- Faculty of Geography
- Faculty of Fundamental Medicine
- Faculty of Space Research
- Faculty of History
- Faculty of Philology
- Faculty of Philosophy
- Faculty of Economics
- Faculty of Law
- Faculty of Journalism
- Faculty of Psychology
- Institute of Asian and African Countries
- Faculty of Sociology
- Faculty of Foreign Languages and Area Studies
- Faculty of Public Administration
- Faculty of World Politics
- Faculty of Political Science
- Faculty of Fine and Performing Arts
- Faculty of Global Studies
- Faculty of Education
- Graduate School of Business Administration
- Faculty of Physics and Chemistry
- Moscow School of Economics
- Graduate School of Translation and Interpretation
- Graduate School of Public Administration
- Graduate School of Public Audit
- Graduate School of Administration and Innovations
- Graduate School of Innovative Business Administration
- Graduate School of Contemporary Social Sciences
- Graduate School of Television
- Center of Military Training

=== Institutions and research centers ===
- Skobeltsyn Institute of Nuclear Physics
- Institute of Mechanics
- Sternberg Astronomical Institute
- A.N. Belozersky Institute of Physico-Chemical Biology
- Research Computing Center
- N.N. Bogolyubov Institute for Theoretical Problems of Microphysics
- White Sea Biological Station
- Moscow University Herbarium

== Academic reputation ==
University rankings

Global – Overall
- ARWU World: 101–150 (2024)
- QS World: =105 (2026)
- THE World: =107 (2025)

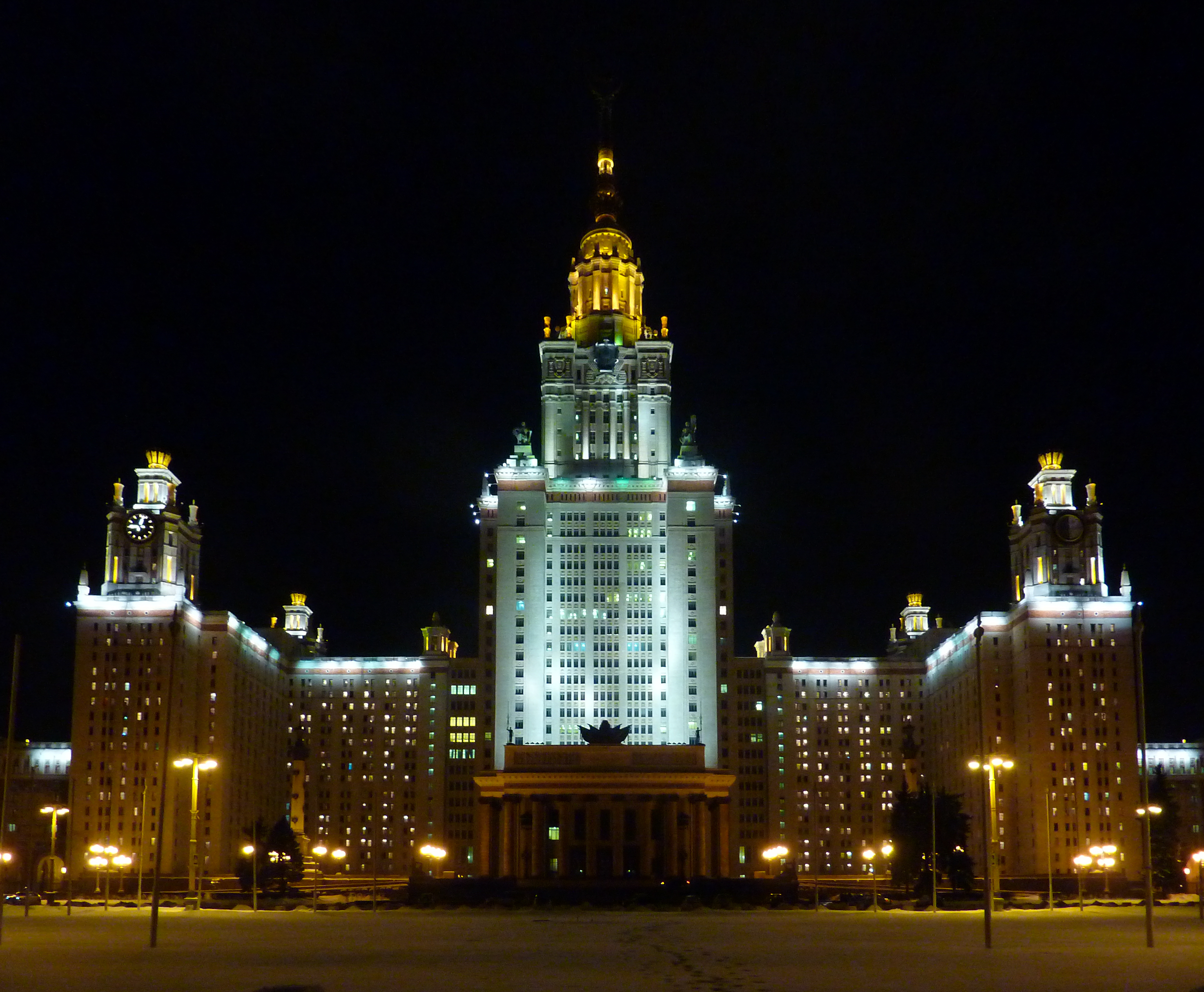
The main building in winter

In world rankings, MSU was ranked 101st–150th by the Academic Ranking of World Universities 2024, and 105th by QS World University Rankings 2026. These world rankings have been the subject of criticism though, for being skewed toward English-speaking universities and countries where publication is generally in English.

The RAEX Ranking of Russian universities has consistently put the Moscow State University on first place in both the categories "Conditions for receiving a high-quality education" and "Level of research activity" between 2012 and 2026 on their ranking of the "100 Best Russian Universities", and thereby top position overall. In the category "Employers’ Demand for Graduates" it was listed on first place for eight of those fifteen years and second place for five of those years, but went down to third place in 2025 and 2026.

The institution's international reputation was severely undermined because of its support for the 2022 Russian invasion of Ukraine. There has also been an impact on its academic reputation in the West, due to allegations of unfair admission practices and lack of impartiality in the awarding of degrees.

(See: Sanctions).

== International partnerships ==
The university has contacts with universities throughout the world, exchanging students and lecturers, though official partnerships with the West have generally ended or been frozen since the invasion of Ukraine. Some of the ventures from the 1990s ended earlier due to reorganisation:

- In 1991/1992 the French University College was founded as a Franco-Russian institution associated with Moscow State University, offering a two-year humanities program in law, history, sociology, literature and philosophy, with French university partners and, historically, French professors. Following a gradual process of absorption, in 2016 it was formally introduced into the structure of MSU. Following the invasion of Ukraine, the French professors ended their connection with the university, French-side funding ceased and teaching was taken over by MSU staff. The College continues to exist in its own right though.

- The erstwhile Russian-American University was established in the early 1990s as a "project". The idea of a Russian-American university in Moscow emerged from a Soviet-American conference in June 1989; the initiative came from the president of Independent University in the US, and in the USSR it was supported by “Канун” and Moscow State University. It describes the first concrete step as establishing a one-year business school, with the full university intended to develop subsequently. It became formally the RAU-Corporation at the end of 1991 and then RAU-University.Russian-American University was transformed into RAU-University after having “de facto lost its American component.” Ultimately, the RAU was transformed in 2000 into the Russian-American Faculty of the Ulyanovsk State University, which had started out as a branch of the Moscow State University but later became a university in its own right.

- The Institute of German Science and Culture developed over the period 1991-1993. Already at the earliest stages, it had joint agreements with the universities of Marburg and Bochum and, from 1995, also the Humboldt University Berlin. In 2015, it became the Russian-German Institute of Science and Culture, a structural subdivision of Moscow State University (Русско-германский институт науки и культуры, РГИ), which still exists today.

The University houses the UNESCO International Demography Courses and Hydrology Courses.

== Staff and students ==
The university employs more than 4,000 academics and 15,000 support staff. Approximately 5,000 researchers work at the university's research institutes and facilities. More than 40,000 undergraduates and 7,000 advanced degree candidates are enrolled. Annually, the university hosts approximately 2,000 students, graduate students, and researchers from around the world.

== Notable people ==
Notable alumni of Moscow State University
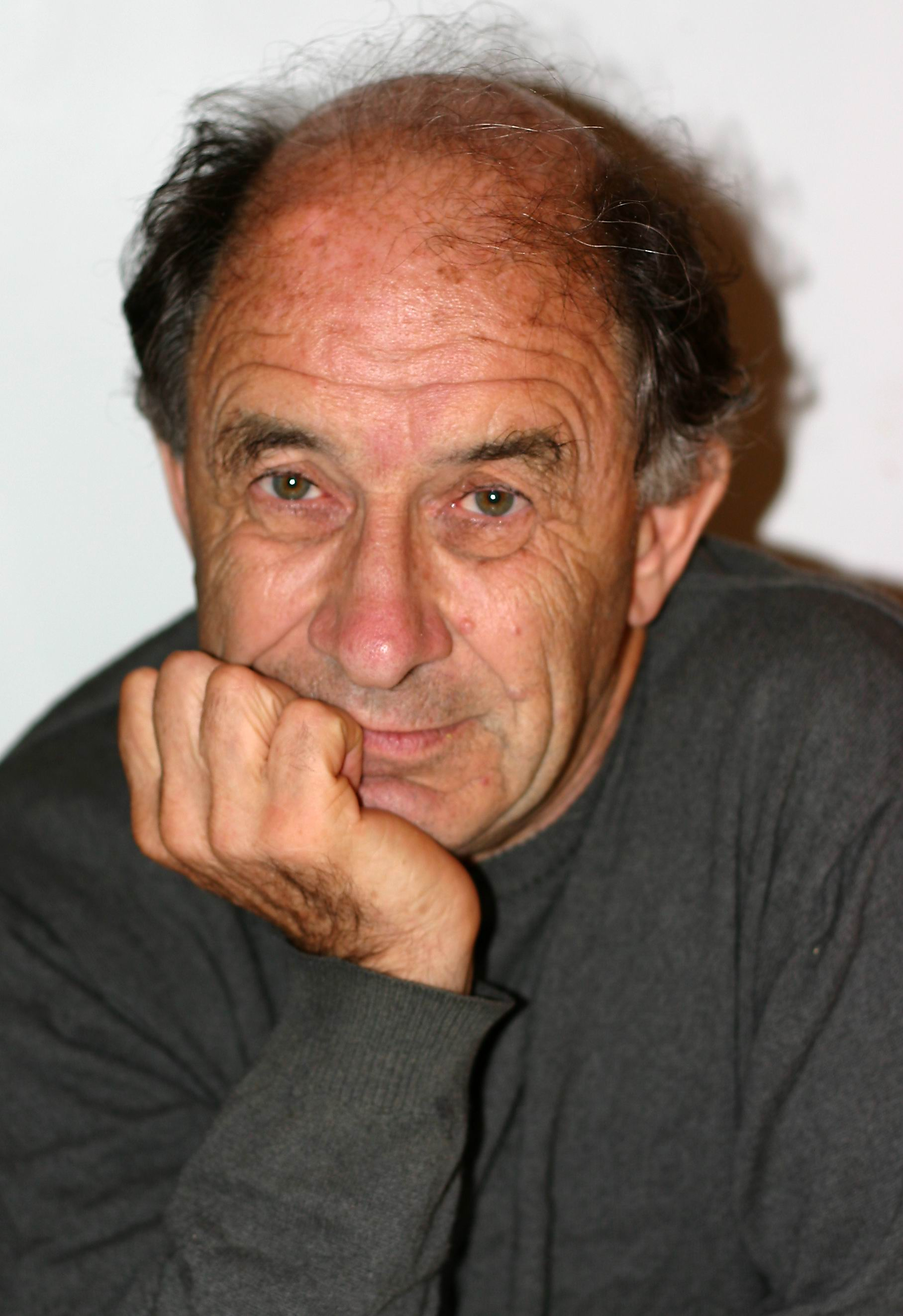
Vladimir Arnold

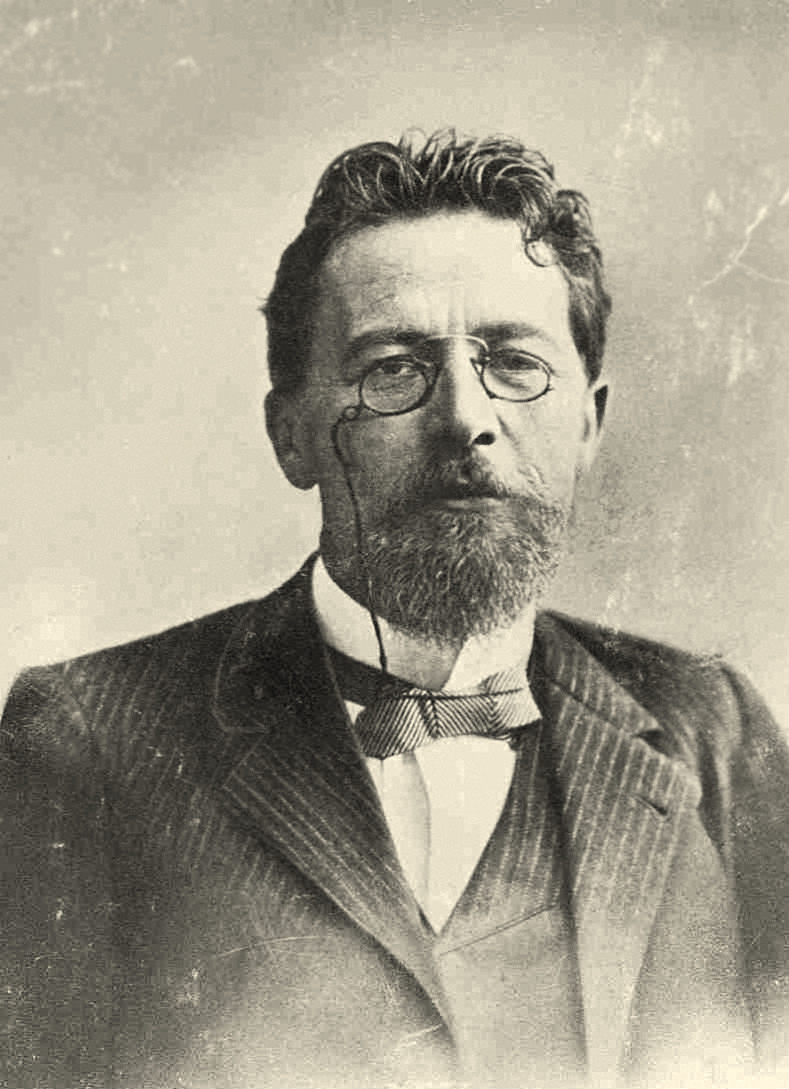
Anton Chekhov

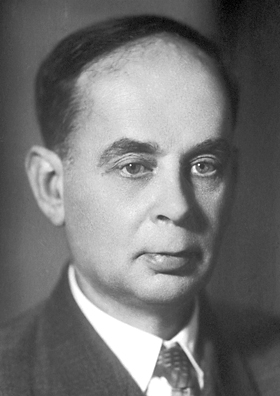
Ilya Frank

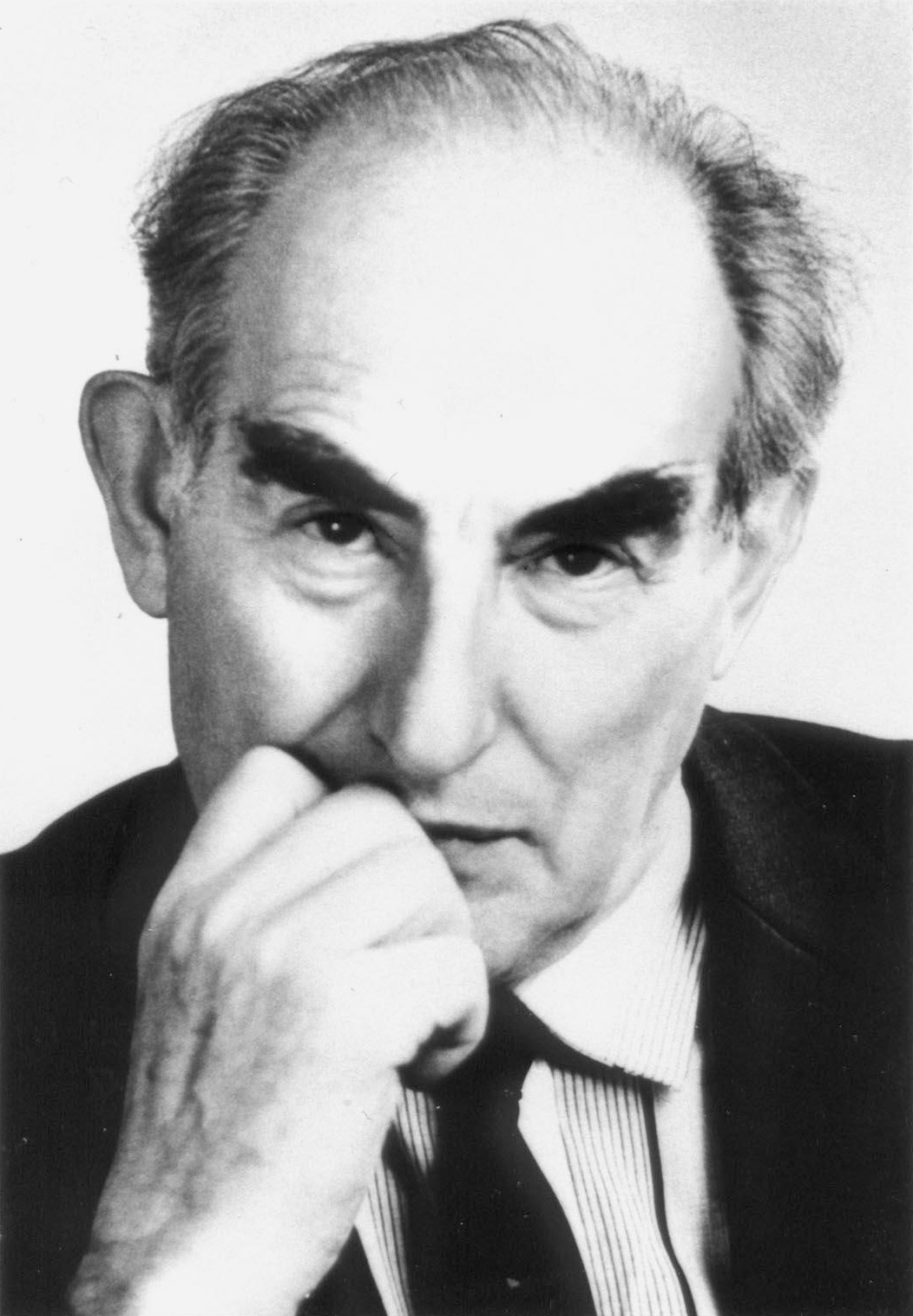
Vitaly Ginzburg

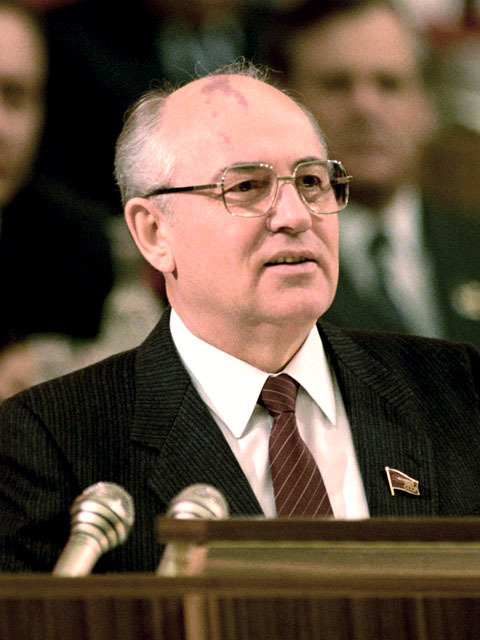
Mikhail Gorbachev

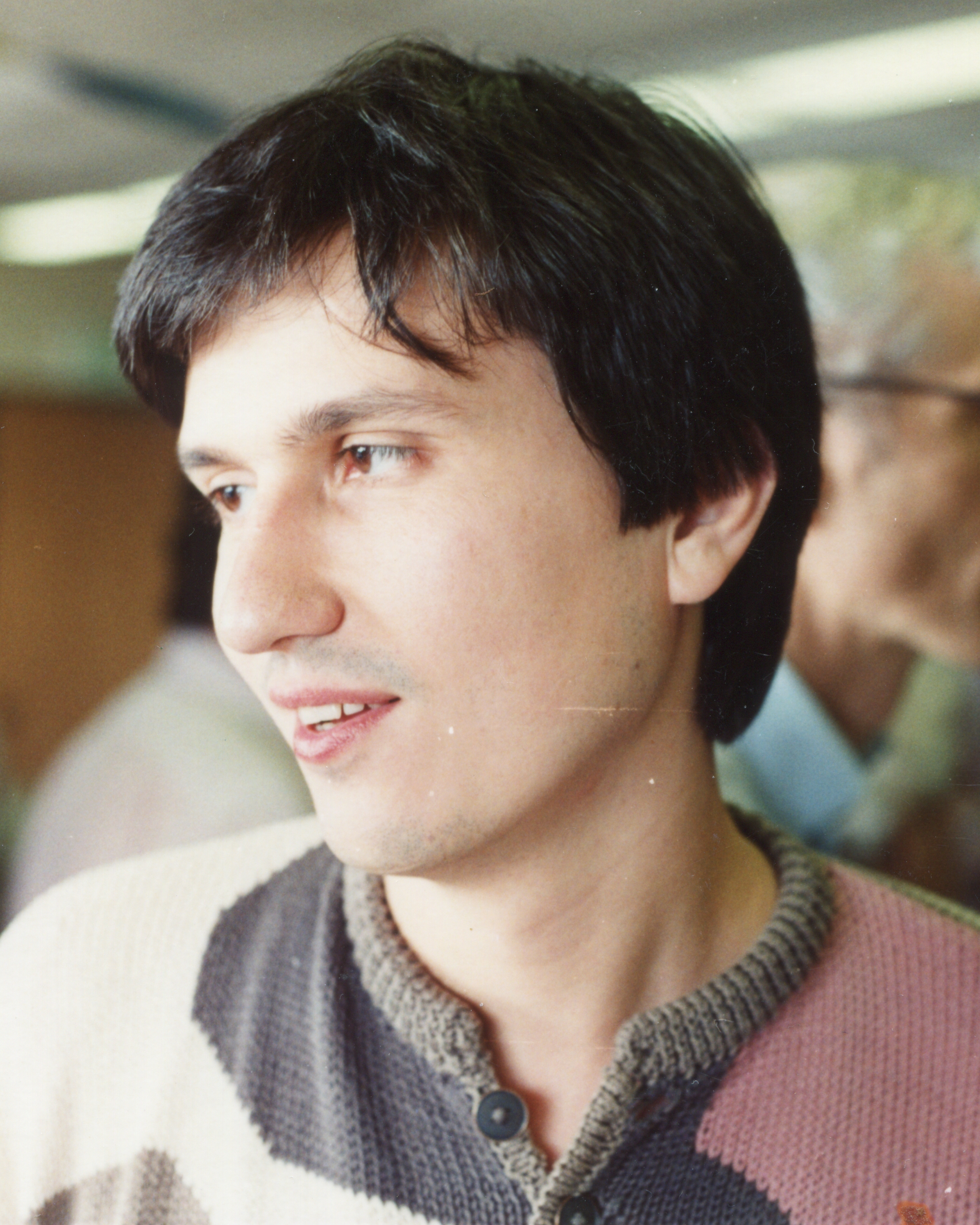
Maxim Kontsevich

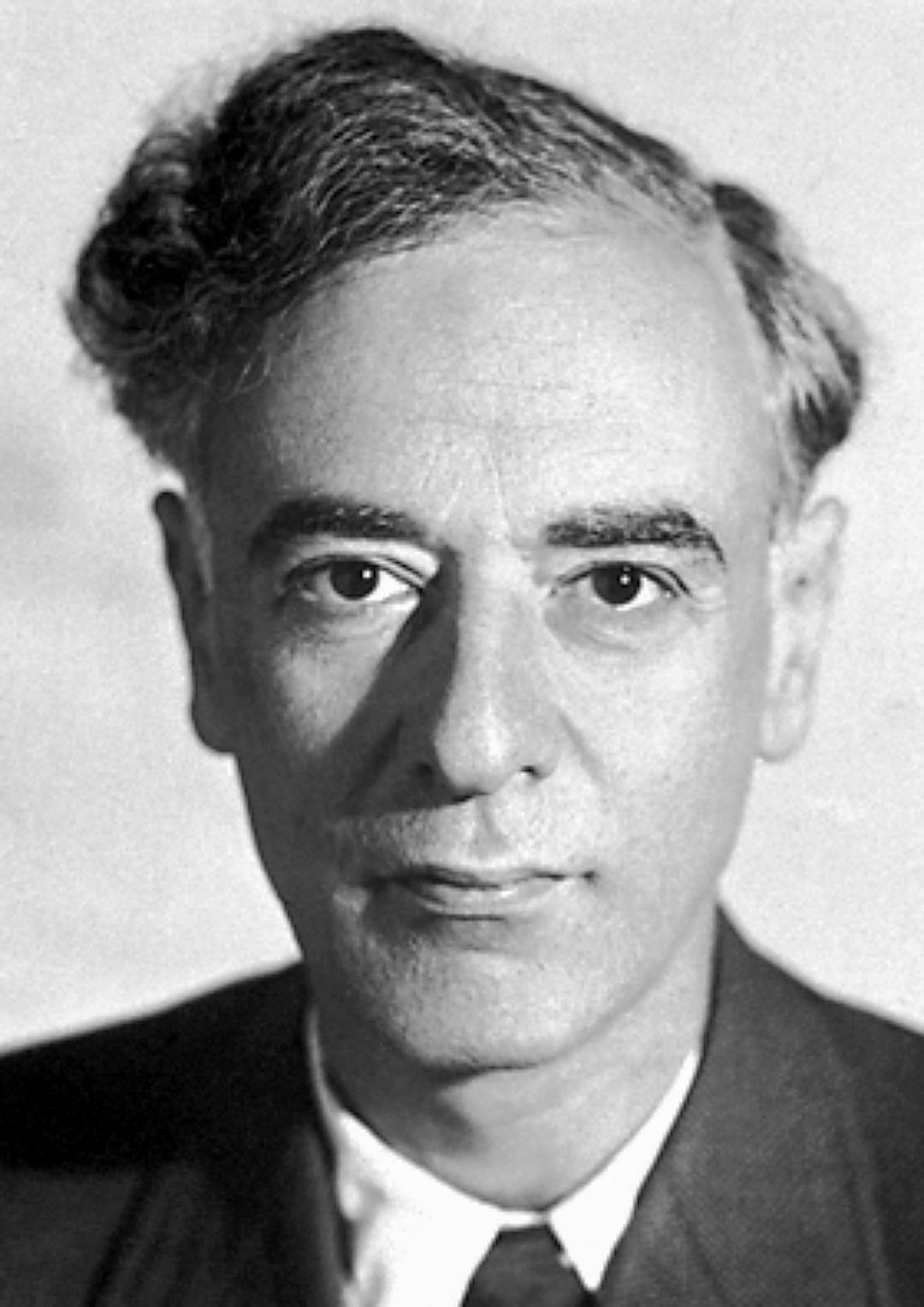
Lev Landau

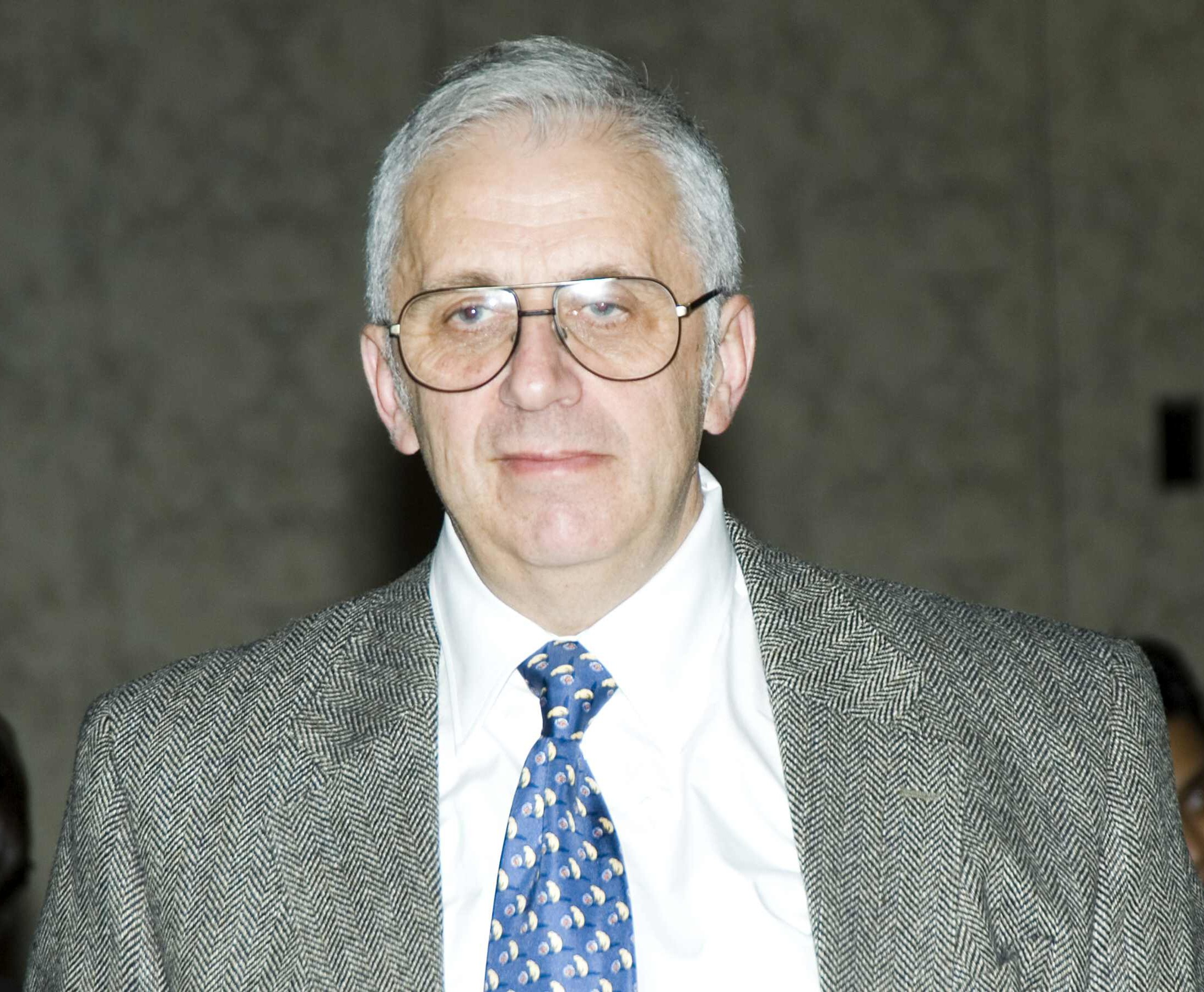
Grigory Margulis

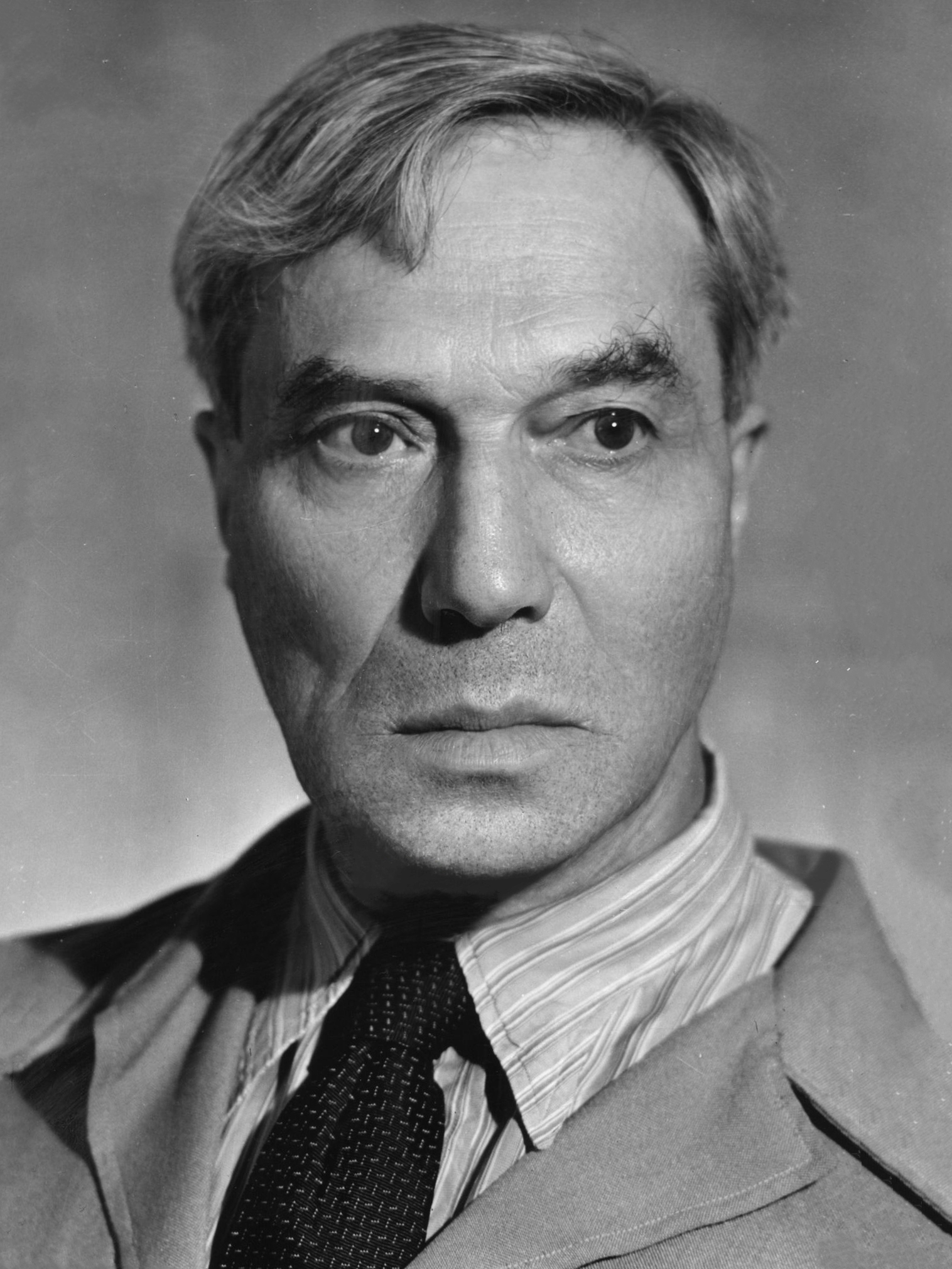
Boris Pasternak

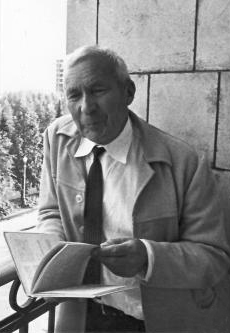
Andrey Kolmogorov

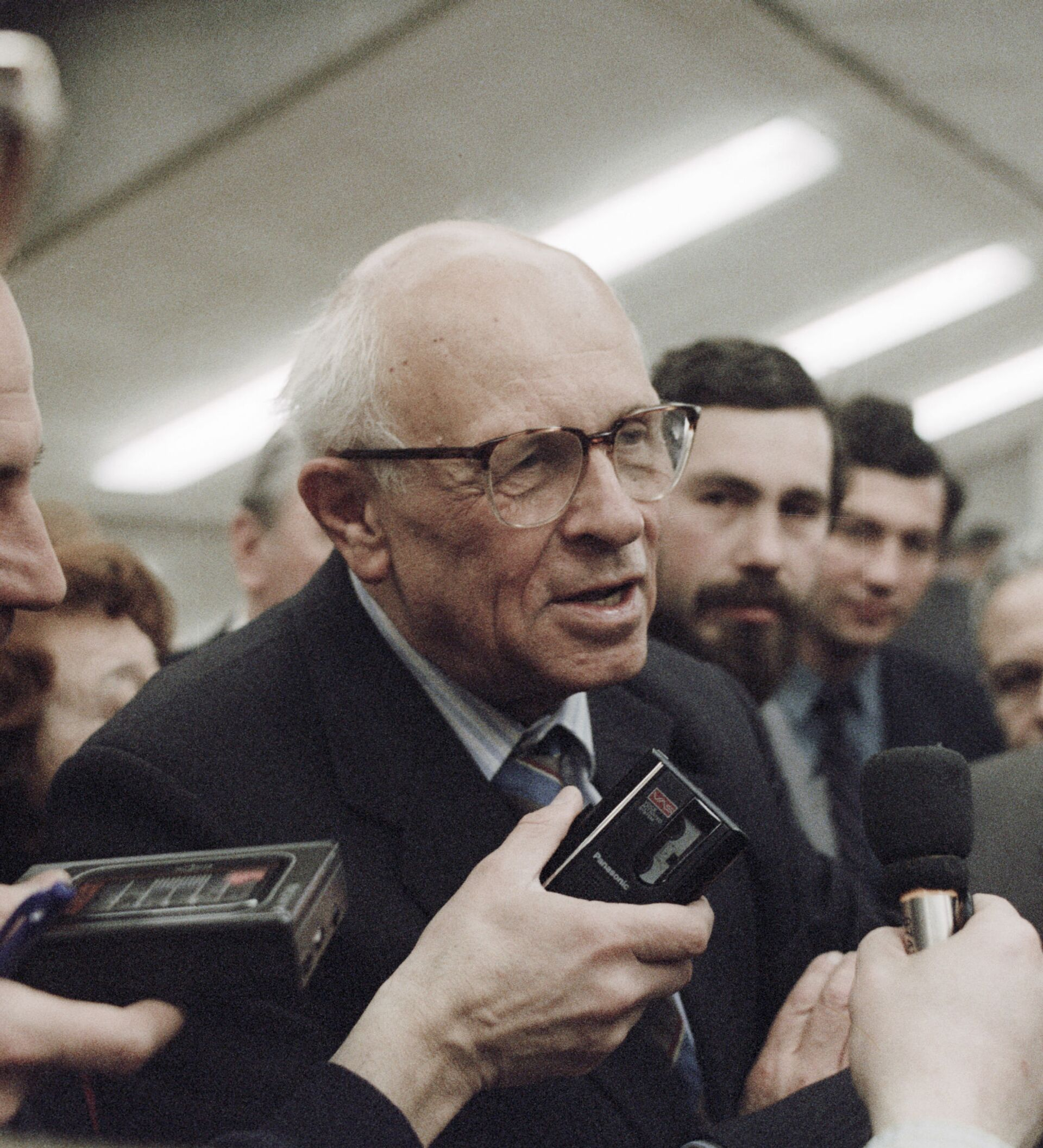
Andrei Sakharov

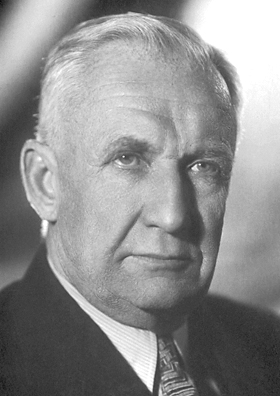
Igor Tamm

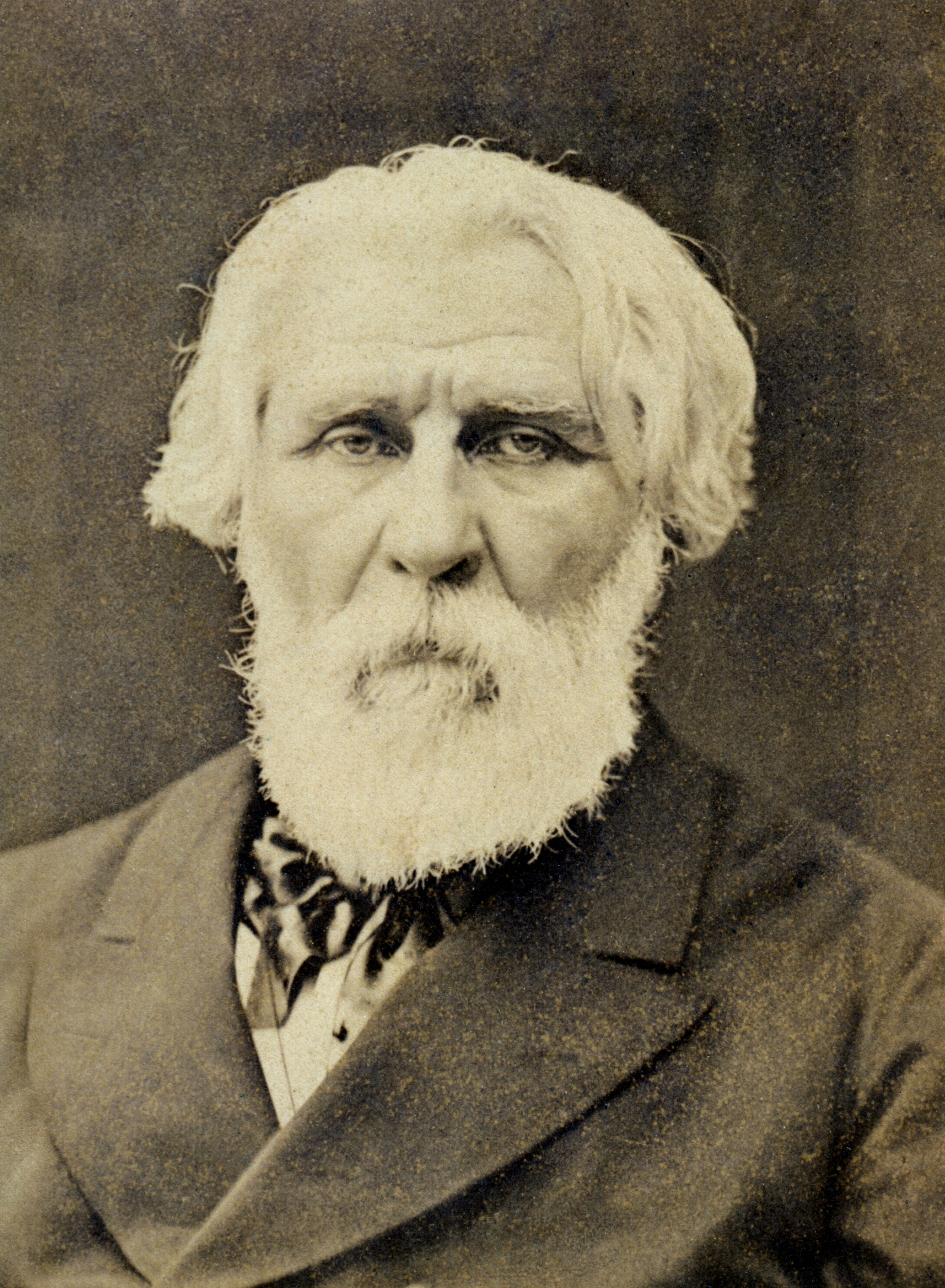
Ivan Turgenev

As of 2017, 13 Nobel laureates, 6 Fields Medal winners and one Turing Award winner had been affiliated with the university. It is the alma mater of writers Anton Chekhov, Boris Pasternak, and Ivan Turgenev; politicians Mikhail Gorbachev, Mikhail Suslov, and Ruslan Khasbulatov; and mathematicians and physicists Vladimir Arnold, Boris Demidovich, Vladimir Drinfeld, Vitaly Ginzburg, Andrey Kolmogorov, Grigory Margulis, Andrei Sakharov, and Yakov Sinai.

== Religious organizations ==
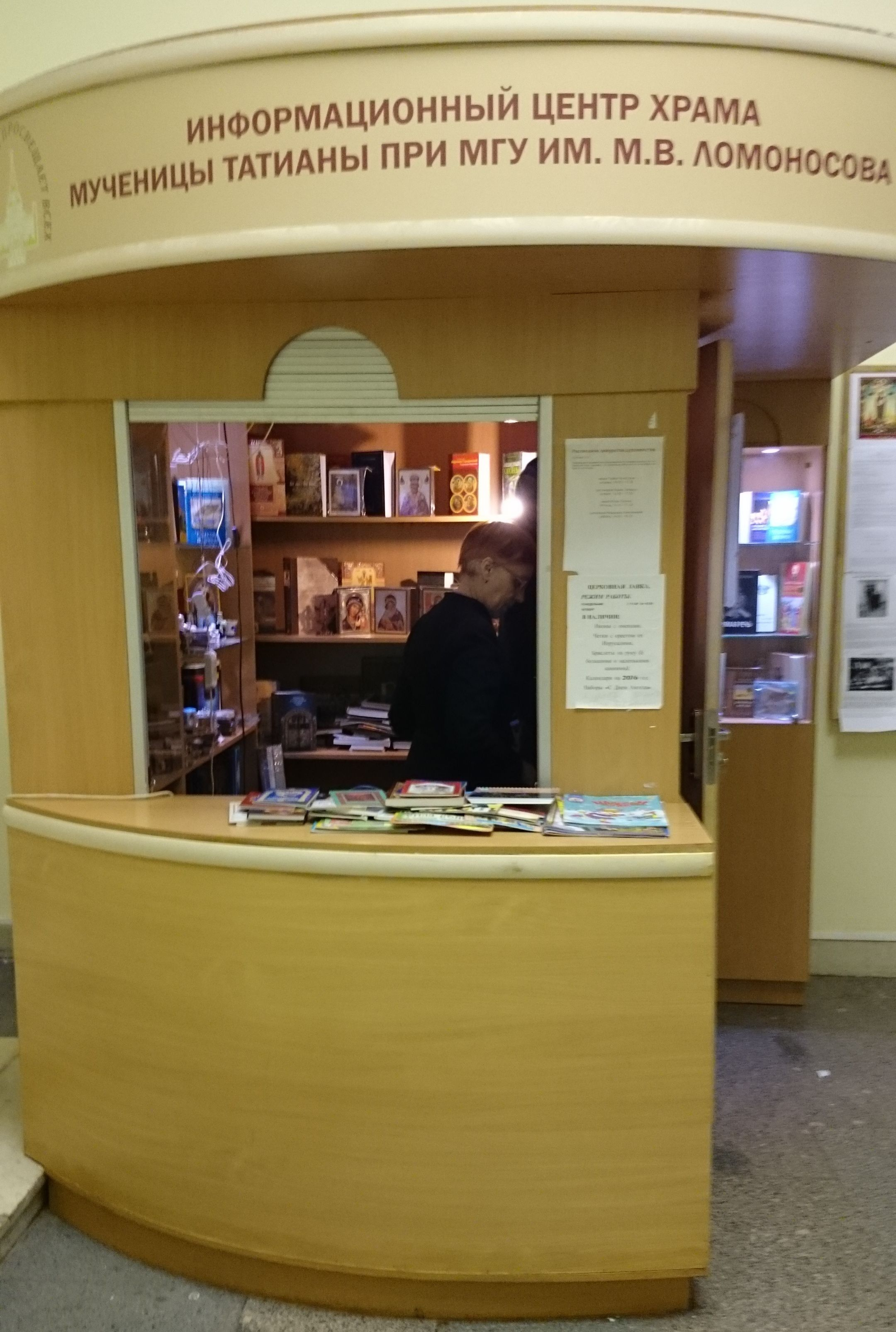
Information Center of the House Church of the Martyr Tatiana at Moscow State University (Main Building, 2016)

Russian legislation prohibits the activities of religious organizations directly at universities, but they operate at Moscow State University. Religious literature and objects of worship are also traded on the territory of Moscow State University.

=== Russian Orthodox Church ===
Orthodox churches at Moscow State University

There are two Orthodox churches at Moscow State University: the house church of the Martyr Tatiana at Moscow State University and the church of the Holy Equal-to-the-Apostles Cyril and Methodius at Moscow State University.

In 2011, Patriarch Kirill appealed to the rector of Moscow State University with a request to support the initiative to erect an Orthodox "chapel temple on the territory of the university complex on Vorobyovy Gory," which, in his opinion, would contribute to "solving many important issues related to the patriotic and spiritual and moral education of Russian youth.". The proposal caused a mixed reaction on social networks and the media.

Interaction of Patriarch Kirill of Moscow and All Russia with Moscow State University

On November 18, 2011, the Academic Council of Moscow University decided to award Patriarch Kirill of Moscow and All Russia the title of Honorary Doctor of Moscow State University "for his outstanding contribution to the spiritual education of young people and close cooperation." On September 28, 2012, during the Patriarch's visit to Moscow State University, Viktor Sadovnichy presented him with the diploma of honorary Doctor of Moscow State University. According to some media reports, before the patriarch's arrival at Moscow State University, students complained that they were being forcibly escorted to a meeting, but the student council and the press service of Moscow State University denied this. At a meeting with representatives of the student council, Rector Viktor Sadovnichy admitted that the facts of coercion were.

== Criticism ==
=== Criminal case for bribery ===
In October 2012, a criminal case was opened against Mikhail Basharatyan, Deputy Dean of the Faculty of World Politics at Moscow State University, and Viktor Baris, Head of the Department of Philosophy and Political Science at the Academy of Labor and Social Relations, under the article "receiving a large-scale bribe by a group of individuals by prior agreement".

The criminal case was opened in accordance with paragraphs "a" and "b" of part 5 of Article 290 of the Criminal Code of the Russian Federation. In mid-October 2012, a young man applying to graduate school contacted the police. In his statement, he indicated that he was offered to pay 30,000 euros for successful admission and subsequent defense of his thesis at the university.

The young man wanted to enter the postgraduate program of the Academy of Labor and Social Relations. For 30 thousand euros, Basharatyan and Baris promised to ensure admission and postgraduate studies, and also assured that he would have no problems with his PhD thesis and with its defense at Lomonosov Moscow State University. On October 30, as part of the previously reached agreements, the suspects received 1 million rubles as a bribe. At the time of receiving the money, the criminals were caught red-handed.

After his detention, Basharatyan was arrested, and the case was brought to court in 2014. At the same time, Basharatyan was not a member of any university dissertation council, so he could not influence the result of the defense of postgraduate works.

=== Fake dissertations ===
According to the Dissernet online expert community for 2014, MSU is one of the largest dissertative corporations in Russia that produce fake dissertations. Community experts note that the main sources of such dissertations at Moscow State University are the Faculty of Public Administration under the leadership of V. A. Nikonov and the Faculty of Sociology under the leadership of V. I. Dobrenkov.

According to Dissernet data on 12/19/2020, Moscow State University ranks 4th among Russian universities in terms of the number of employees convicted of dishonesty (232), significantly behind the leader in this nomination, Plekhanov Russian University of Economics (382 cases).

=== Threats of expulsion and insults ===
In early March 2021, the media reported on insults and threats of expulsion of students related to the MSU Initiative Group. Lyudmila Grigorieva, Deputy Dean of the Faculty of Fundamental Physico-Chemical Engineering at Moscow State University, demanded that students join the harassment of one of the MSU eco-activists, demanding that students write negative comments on the activist's wall on social networks. In the process of communicating with students, Grigorieva called the MSU Initiative Group a "gang" and "Western liberals who are being fed by the West.". "They are against the country, against the university... They are given some crumbs and some leftovers there [in the West]. And so they grunt here for these scraps, crawl and shit all the time," Grigorieva said about the activists' activities.

== Moscow State University in philately ==
Russian and Soviet stamps

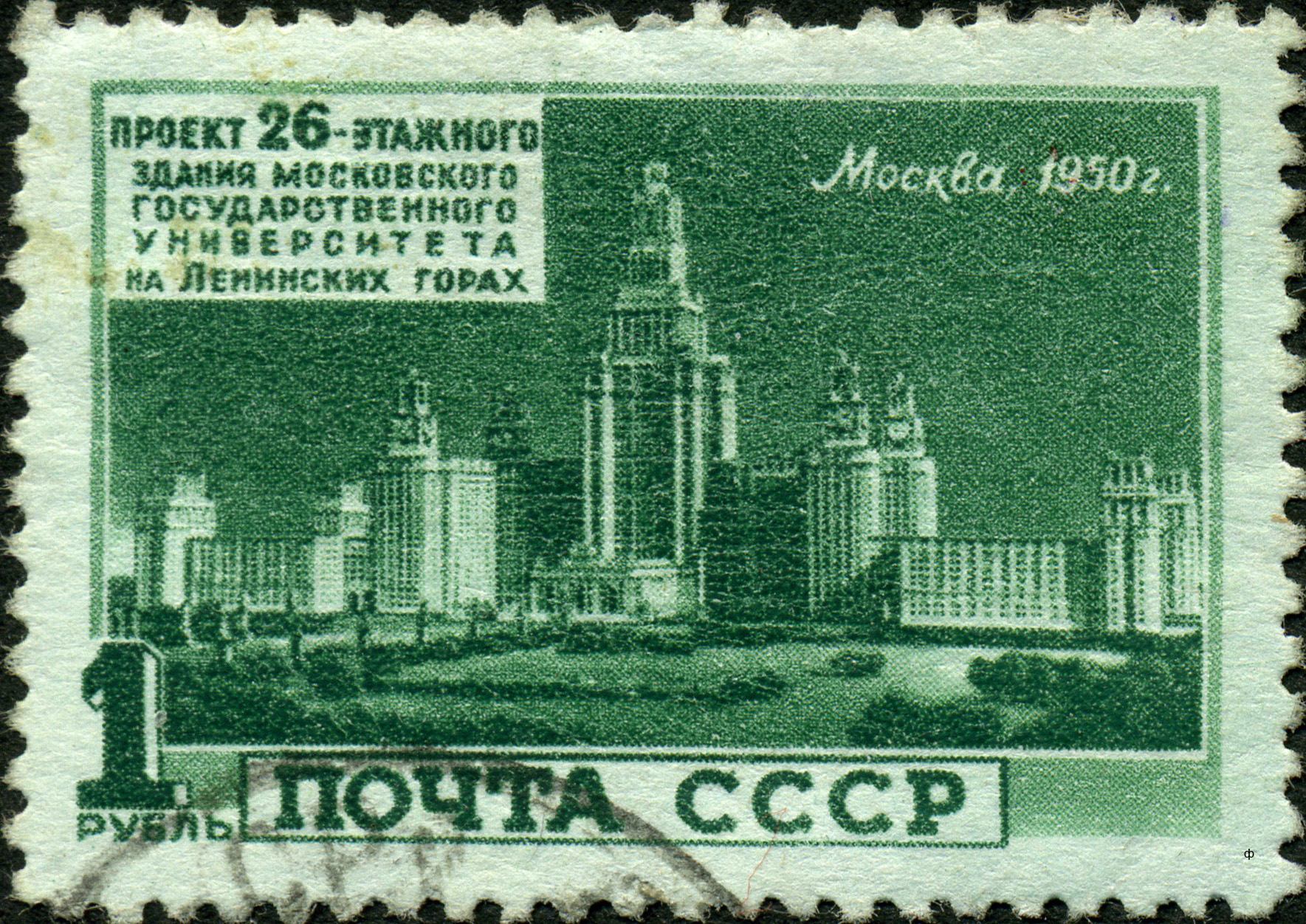
1950 postage stamp:
the project of the 26-storey building of Moscow State University

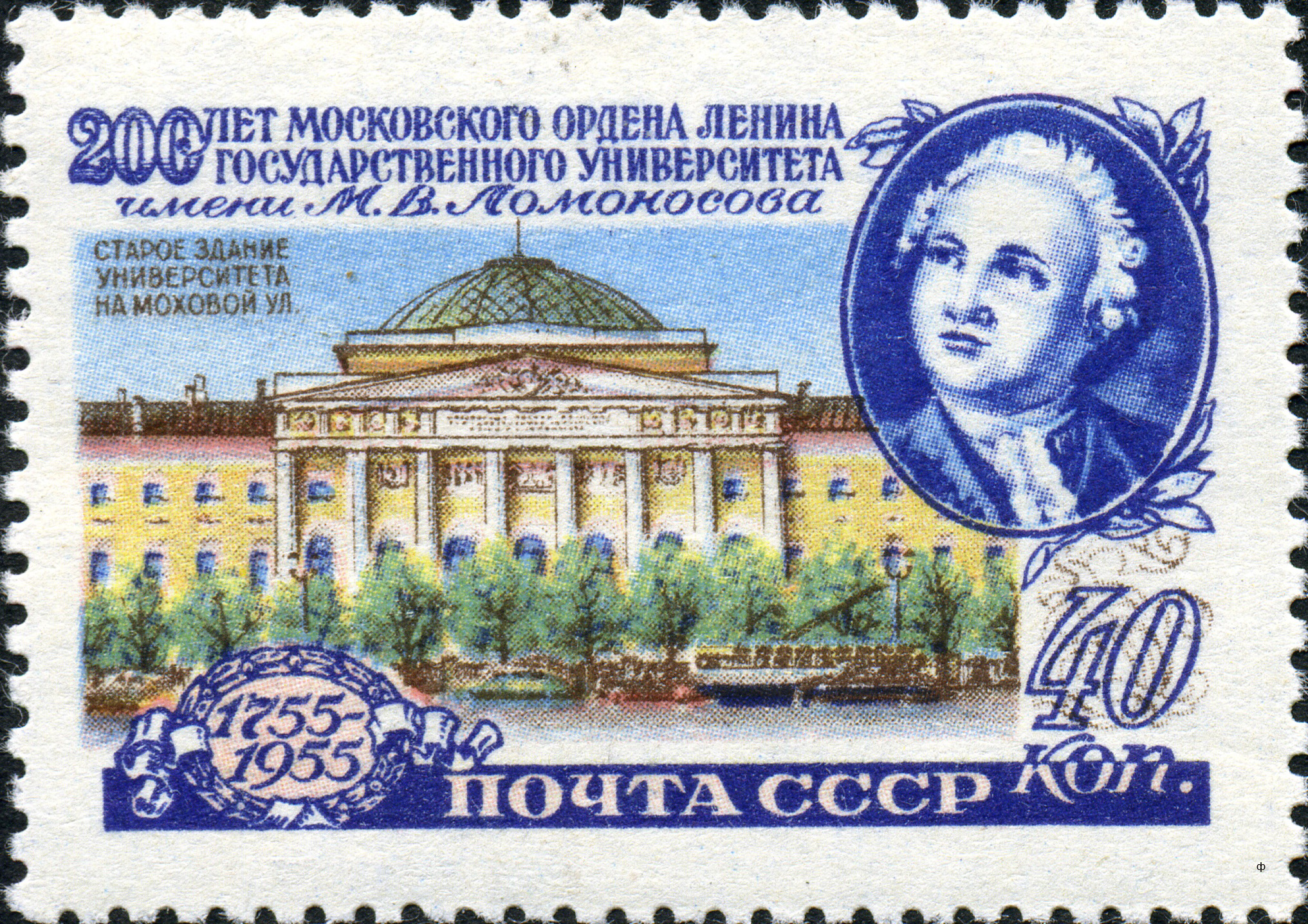
1955 postage stamp:
the old university building

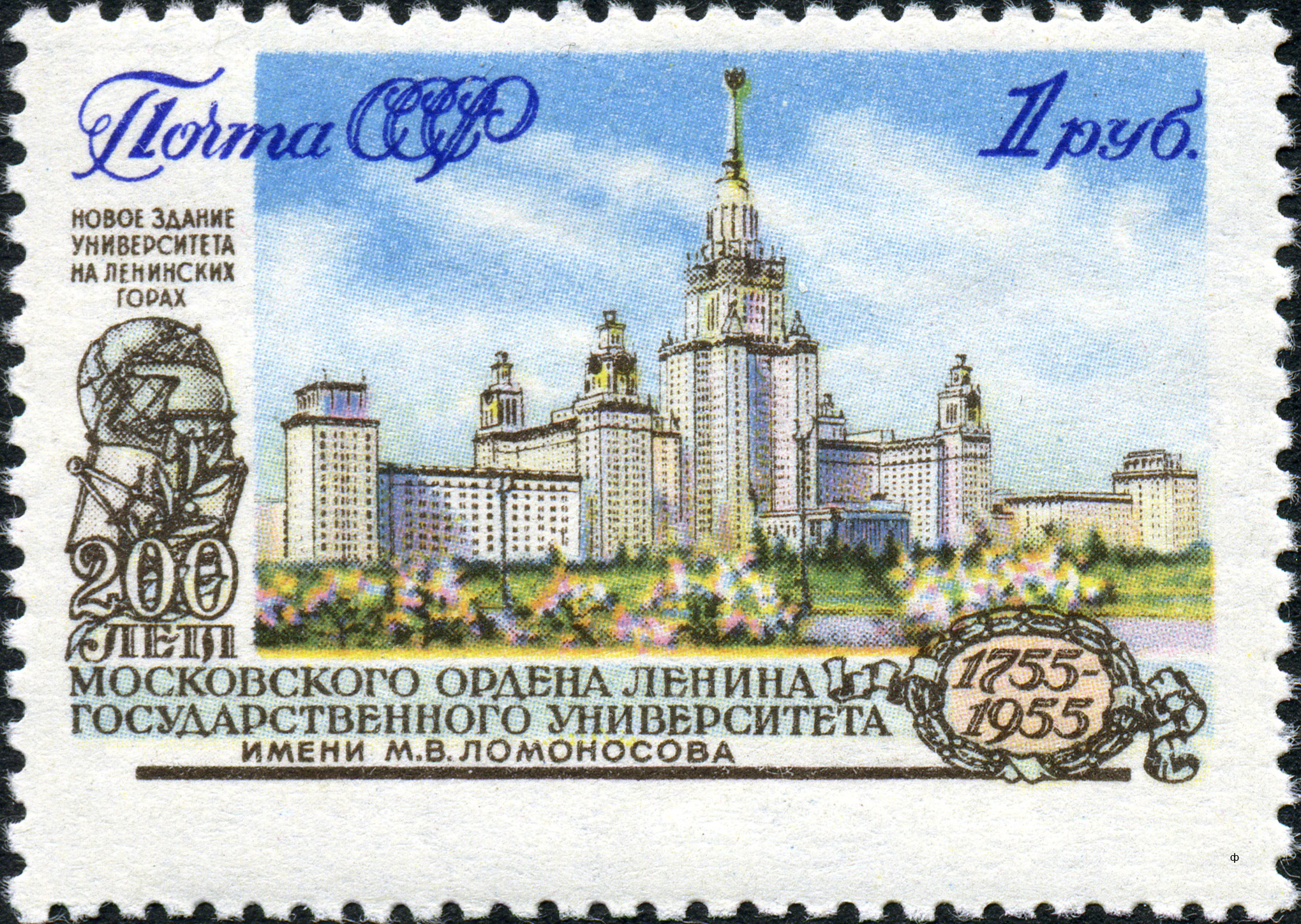
1955 postage stamp:
the new university building

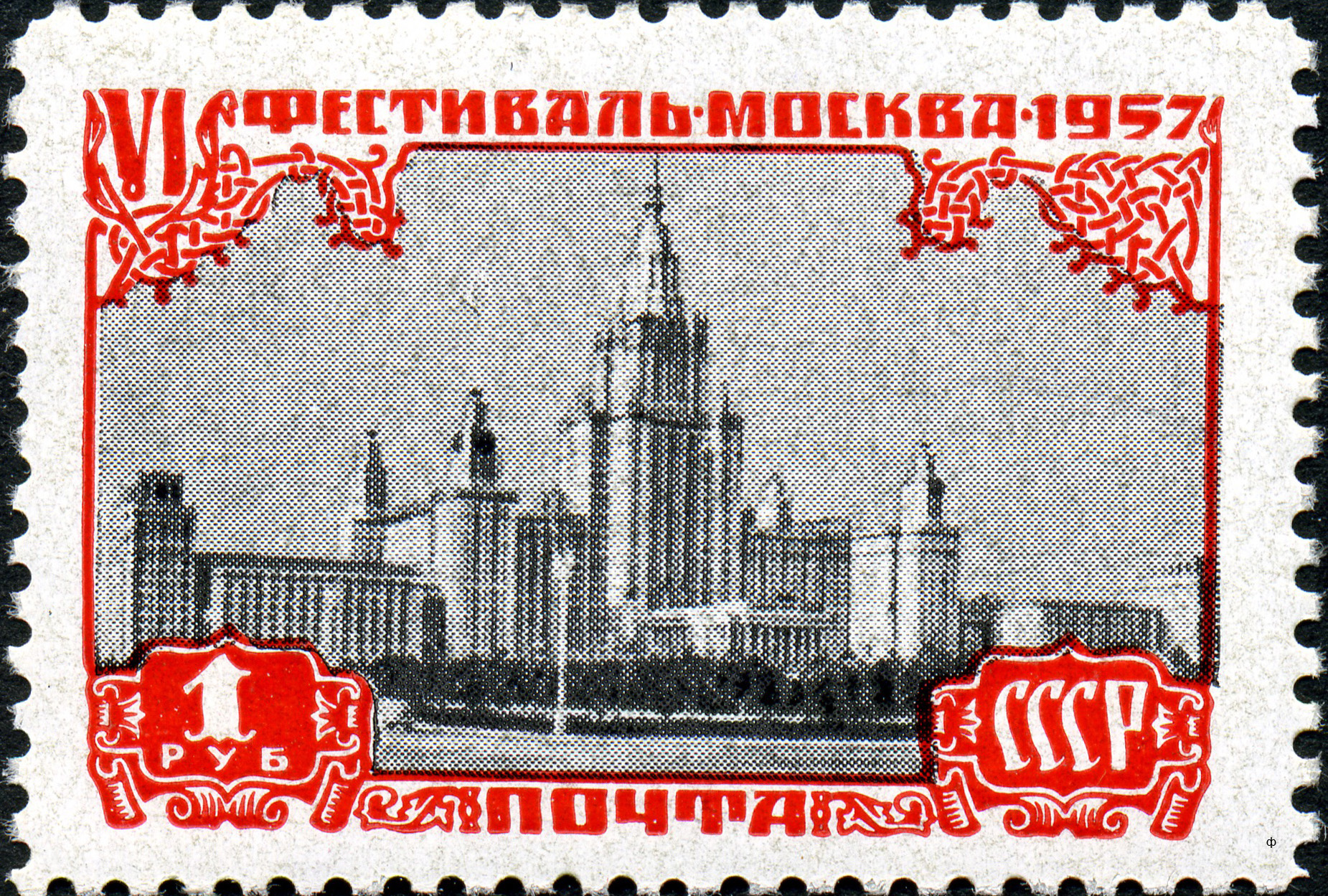
1957 postage stamp:
Moscow Festival of Youth and Students

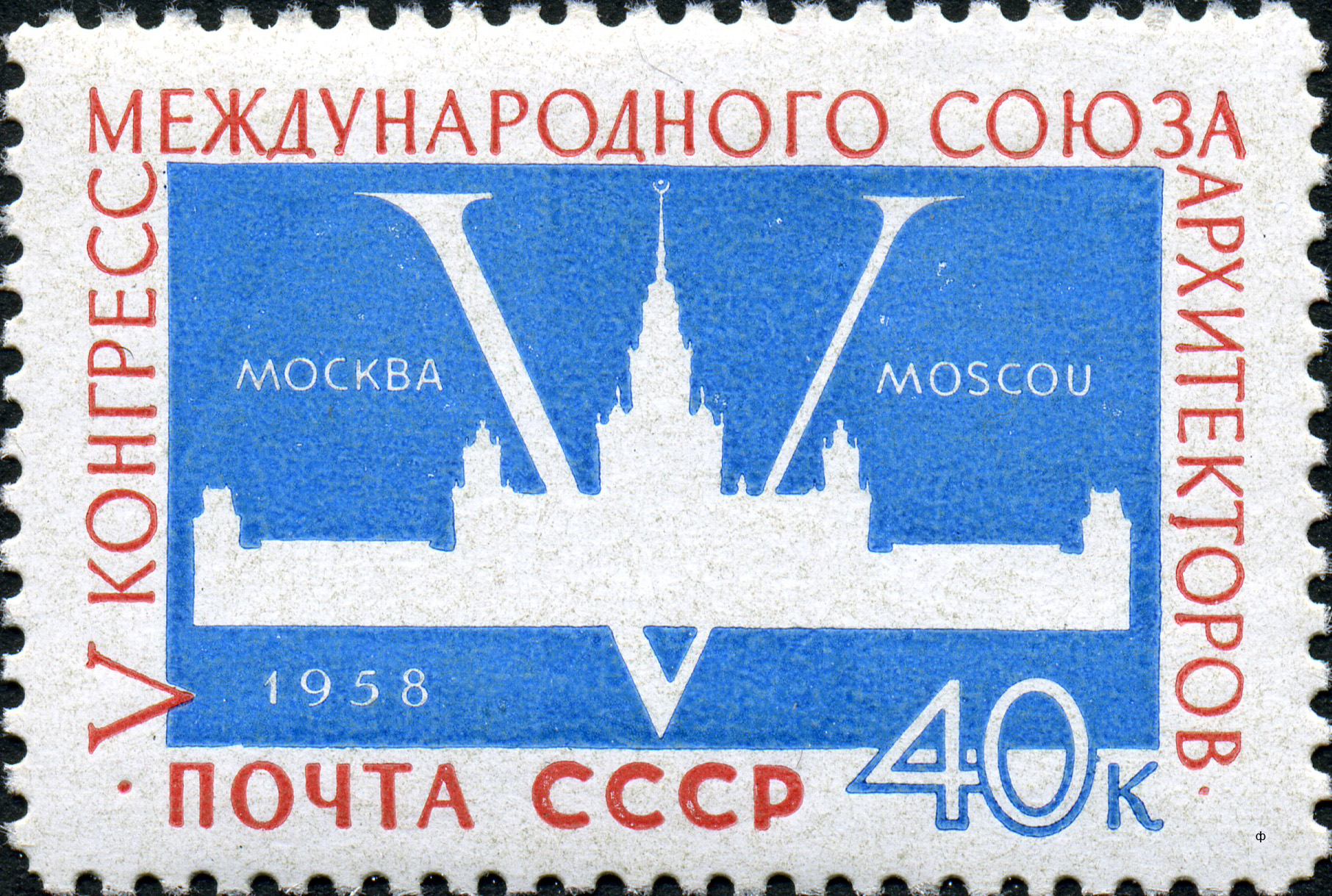
1958 postage stamp:
V Congress of the International Union of Architects

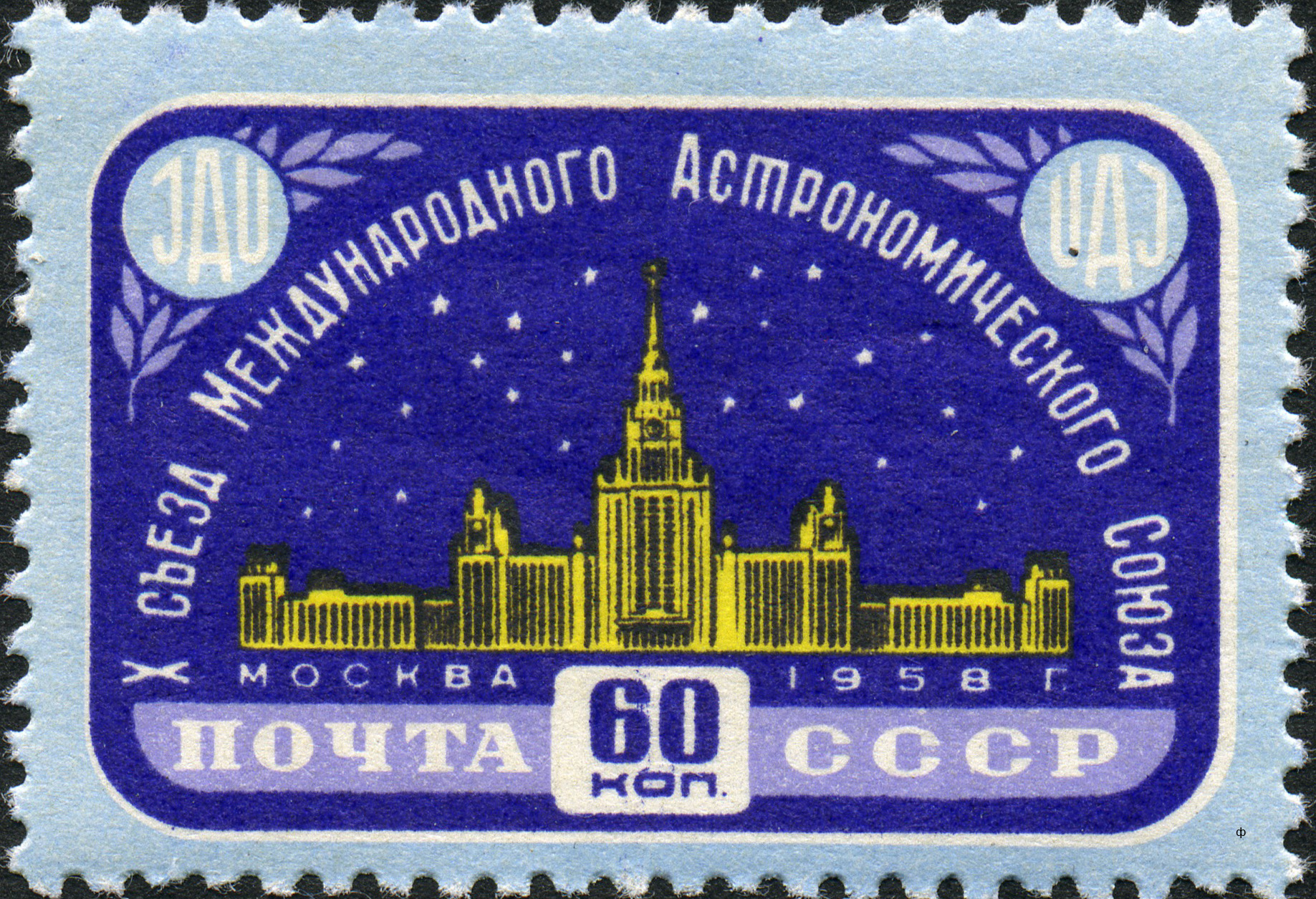
1958 postage stamp:
X Congress of the International Astronomical Union in the new university building

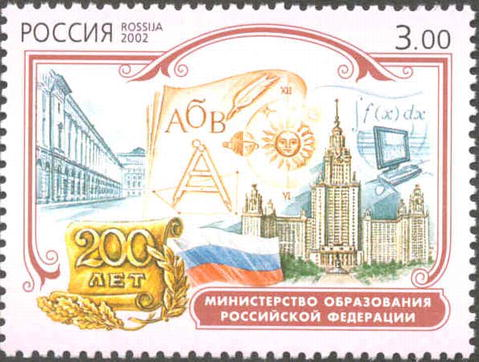
2002 postage stamp:
200th anniversary of the Ministry of Education of the Russian Federation

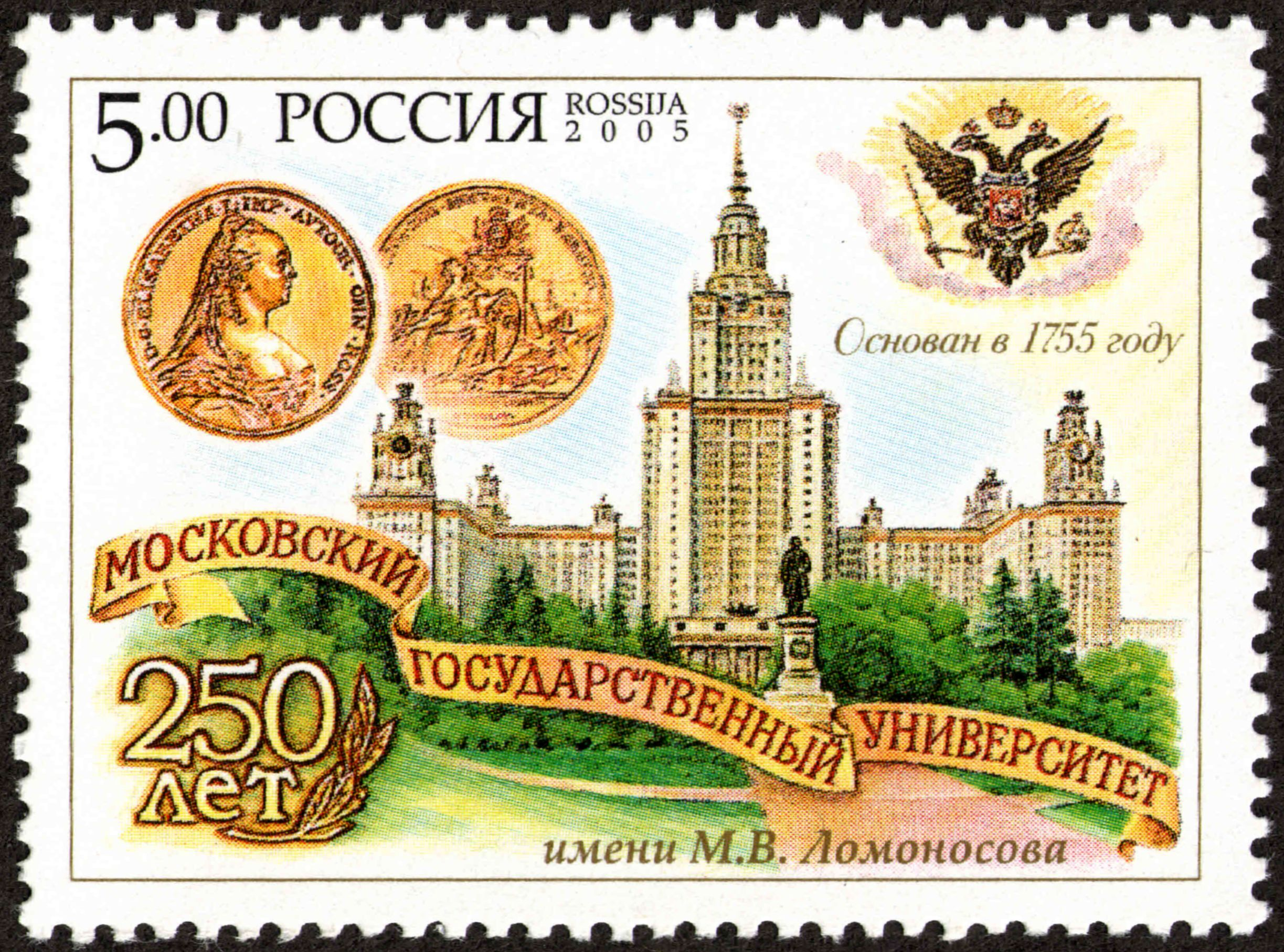
2005 postage stamp:
250th anniversary of Moscow State University

== See also ==
- Education in Russia
- List of early modern universities in Europe
- List of universities in Russia
- List of rectors of Moscow State University
- List of honorary professors of the Moscow State University
