= Eižens =

Latvian masculine given name

- Gender: Male
- Name day: November 13

Origin
- Region of origin: Latvia

Other names
- Related names: Eiženija

Eižens is a Latvian masculine given name. The associated name day is November 13.

== Notable people named Eižens ==
- Eižens Ārinš (1911–1987), Latvian mathematician and computer scientist
- Eižens Finks (1885–1958), Latvian photographer and clairvoyant
- Eižens Laube (1880–1967), Latvian architect
- Eižens Leimanis (1905–1992), Latvian mathematician
