= Trojan War in literature and the arts =

There are a wide range of ways in which people have represented the Trojan War in literature and the arts.

== Art ==
=== Painting ===
- The pre-war episodes of Leda and the Swan and the Judgement of Paris were frequent subjects in art from the Renaissance onwards.
- Laocoön, c.1610–1614, a painting by El Greco.
- Helen of Troy by Evelyn De Morgan
- Fifty Days at Iliam by Cy Twombly, painted in 1978
- Sketches of Giovanni Domenico Tiepolo, illustrating the fall of Troy

=== Mosaic ===
- In a Roman villa complex at Rutland in the United Kingdom, a third or fourth century mosaic depicts the fight between Achilles and Hector.

=== Pottery ===
Innumerable ancient items, including:

- the Trojan War was a classic subject for the Pottery of ancient Greece (for example see the potter Exekias and certain bands of the François Vase).
- the Mykonos vase, pottery depiction of the Trojan war and horse

=== Sculpture ===
- the Medici Vase
- Laocoön and His Sons
- A marble sarcophagus believed to date back to the second century and unearthed at the northwestern Turkey, depicts the Trojan war, showing the Greek heroes Agamemnon and Achilles.

== Literature ==
=== Classical ===
==== Greek ====
- the Iliad and Odyssey of Homer
- other poems in the Epic Cycle (all lost):
  - the Kypria, attributed to Stasinos of Cyprus
  - the Aithiopis
  - the Little Iliad
  - the Iliou Persis ("Sack of Troy")
  - the Nostoi ("Returns")
- several poems by Stesichorus, Alcaeus, and Sappho
- numerous plays, mostly tragedies of which the extant ones are:
  - by Aeschylus:
    - Agamemnon
    - Libation Bearers
  - by Sophocles:
    - Ajax
    - Philoctetes
    - Electra
  - by Euripides:
    - Iphigenia at Aulis
    - Trojan Women
    - Hecuba
    - Andromache
    - Helen
    - Electra
    - Orestes
    - Iphigenia in Tauris
    - Cyclops
  - of disputed authorship (traditionally attributed to Euripides):
    - Rhesus
- the Heroicus by Philostratus the Elder (3rd century)
- the Capture of Troy by Triphiodorus
- a lipogrammatic Iliad by Nestor of Laranda
- the Posthomerica by Quintus of Smyrna (4th century AD)
- excerpts from Pseudo-Apollodorus' Bibliotheca (1st or 2nd century AD)
- a prose paraphrase of the Iliad by Demosthenes the Thracian (now lost).

==== Latin ====
- the Aeneid by Virgil (book 2)
- the Metamorphoses by Ovid (books 12–14)
- the Heroides by Ovid (I, III, V, VII)
- the Double Heroides by Ovid (XVI & XVII)
- the Ephemeris, purporting to be by Dictys of Crete
- the Fall of Troy, purporting to be by Dares of Phrygia
- the Achilleis by Statius

=== Medieval ===
- Roman de Troie by Benoît de Sainte-Maure (ca. 1160), derived from Dictys and Dares.
- De bello Troiano by Joseph of Exeter (1183–4)
- Historiae destructionis Troiae by Guido delle Colonne (1287), derived from Benoît.
- Il filostrato by Boccaccio, derived from Benoît and Guido.
- Troilus and Criseyde by Geoffrey Chaucer, a poem in rhyme royal telling a tragic love story set during the war; derived from the above works.
- The Rawlinson Excidium Troie
- The Seege of Troye, a Middle English poem based on "Dares" and Benoît.
- The Laud Troy Book, another Middle English poem, written about 1400.
- Troy Book by John Lydgate, a Middle English poem composed 1412–20.

=== Modern ===
- Recuyell of the Historyes of Troye, published in 1474, the first printed book to be published in English, containing William Caxton's translation of Raoul le Fevre's work, in turn derived from Guido and, ultimately, Benoît.
- Christopher Marlowe's The Tragical History of Doctor Faustus, written circa 1590, features Helen of Troy.
- Troilus and Cressida, William Shakespeare's dark interpretation of Chaucer's story, derived from Caxton's Recuyell written in 1602.
- The Dismissal of the Greek Envoys play by Jan Kochanowski, 1578
- The Iron Age, Part One and Part Two (1632) by Thomas Heywood.
- Penthesilea play by Heinrich von Kleist, 1808.
- Faust, Part 2 by Johann Wolfgang von Goethe published in 1832 features Helen of Troy.
- Several poems by William Butler Yeats make reference to the Trojan War or Troy in the context of the Trojan War.
  - No Second Troy, published in 1910
  - A Man Young and Old VI, published in 1928
  - Leda and the Swan, published in 1928
- The Great Legend by Rex Stout, serialized in 1917, published in 1997.
- The Green Scamander, novel by Maude Meagher, published in 1933.
- The Trojan War Will Not Take Place, play by Jean Giraudoux, written in 1935.
- A Trojan Ending, novel by Laura Riding (Deya: Seizin Press; London: Constable, 1937).
- Whom the Gods Would Destroy by Richard P. Powell, published in 1970.
- Kassandra by Christa Wolf, published in 1983.
- The Greek Generals Talk (1986) and The Trojan Generals Talk collections of short stories by Phillip Parotti.
- Cassandra: Princess of Troy by Hilary Bailey published in 1993.
- The Song of Troy by Colleen McCullough published in 1998.
- The Nantucket series by S. M. Stirling involves a time-travelling American adventurer overthrowing Agamemnon and proceeding to himself conquer and destroy Troy, in a manner quite different from that depicted by Homer. (Published 1998–2000)
- The Songs of the Kings by Barry Unsworth, published in 2002.
- Ilium by Dan Simmons, published in 2003, gives the story of Troy a science fiction twist.
- The Siege of Troy by Greg Tobin published in 2004.
- The Talisman of Troy: A Novel by Valerio Massimo Manfredi published in 2004.
- Lindsay Clarke's Troy Quartet:
  - The War at Troy, published in 2004.
  - Return from Troy, published in 2005.
  - The Spoils of Troy, published in 2019.
  - A Prince of Troy, published in 2019.
- War Music by Christopher Logue, a Modernist retelling of books 1–8 and 16–19 of Homer's Iliad, published between 1959 and 2005.
- Gene by Stel Pavlou, published in 2005, is the story of a soldier from the Trojan War reincarnated seven times through history.
- David Gemmell's Troy Series:
  - Troy: Lord of the Silver Bow, published in 2005.
  - Troy: Shield of Thunder, published in 2006.
  - Troy: Fall of Kings, published in 2008.
- Helen of Troy by Margaret George, published in 2006.
- The Song of Achilles, by Madeline Miller, published in 2012 is a retelling of the stories surrounding the Trojan War from the point of view of Patroclus, who the story presents as the lover of Achilles.
- Ransom, by David Malouf, published in 2009, is a retelling of the Iliad, from books 22 to 24. It tells the story of Priam as he goes to Achilles to plead for the return of the body of Hector.
- The Lost Books of the Odyssey, by Zachary Mason, published in 2010, is a creative retelling of the adventures of Odysseus, king of Ithaca, told from the perspective of (mostly) the antagonists of Odysseus, e.g. Polyphemus, Circe, and Penelope.
- The Starcrossed Series, by Josephine Angelini published 2011-2013 is a modern retelling of history repeating itself with flashbacks to the original war, focusing on the characters of Helen and Paris.
- The Silence of the Girls, by Pat Barker published in 2018 is a retelling from the point of view of Briseis.
- A Thousand Ships, by Natalie Haynes, published in 2019 is a retelling from various female characters' points of view.

== Music ==
- "Temporary Like Achilles", by singer-songwriter Bob Dylan, from the album Blonde on Blonde (1966).
- "Cassandra" by Taylor Swift (from The Tortured Poets Department).
- "Cassandra", by ABBA and released as the B-side of "The Day Before You Came" (1982).
- "Tales of Brave Ulysses", by Cream, released as a B-side in May 1967, and also included on the album Disraeli Gears (1967).
- "Achilles Last Stand", by Led Zeppelin, from the album Presence (1976).
- "Paris", a rock musical by Jon English, first released in 1990 and reworked in 2003 and 2008.
- "Achilles, Agony and Ecstasy in Eight Parts", by Manowar from the album The Triumph of Steel (1992).
- "I Stole a Bride", by the band Hefner, from the album The Fidelity Wars (1999).
- "And Then There Was Silence", by Blind Guardian, released as a single in November 2001, and also included on the album A Night at the Opera (2002); an epic 14 minute song picturing the last part of the Trojan War through Cassandra's eyes.
- The Progressive Rock band, Symphony X released their album, The Odyssey in 2002, based upon Homer's epic.
- The name of the American post-hardcore band The Fall of Troy is inspired by the Trojan War.
- The entire album Ethernaut (2003), by the band The Crüxshadows, was based on the Trojan War and the fall of Troy.
- "The Third Temptation of Paris" by the band Alesana, from the album On Frail Wings of Vanity and Wax (2006); a piano ballad picturing the fall of Troy through Paris' eyes.
- "The History of Man", by Maisie Peters, contains the line, "The men start wars yet Troy hates Helen".
- "Achilles Come Down", by Gang of Youths, focuses on Achilles ready to kill himself following the death of Patroclus.
- The Trojan War features in the first two songs of EPIC: The Musical, "The Horse and the Infant" and "Just a Man." In the former, Odysseus rallies his soldiers from inside the Trojan Horse before leading the attack against the sleeping Trojans, only for a vision from Zeus to warn him of a greater foe. Odysseus quickly discovers this apparent enemy is Astyanax, the infant son of the Trojan Prince Hector, and Zeus warns Odysseus that Astyanax will destroy his homeland of Ithaca if he is not slain that night. In "Just a Man," Odysseus struggles with the decision but ultimately decides to carry through the deed by dropping Astyanax from the city walls.

== Film ==
- Helena (1924 film), silent German epic film version.
- The Private Life of Helen of Troy (1927), a 1927 American silent comedy adventure film about Helen of Troy based on the 1925 novel of the same name by John Erskine.
- Helen of Troy (1956), featuring Stanley Baker as Achilles.
- Cecil B. DeMille's classic 1956 film The Ten Commandments famously features a brief, subtle nod to Troy by including an ambassador from King Priam presenting silk to Ramesses II.
- La Guerra di Troia (The Trojan War) (1961), by Giorgio Ferroni.
- The Fury of Achilles (1962), Italian sword-and-sandal adaptation of The Iliad.
- Doctor Faustus (1967), by Richard Burton and Nevill Coghill, stars Elizabeth Taylor as Helen of Troy and Richard Burton as Doctor Faustus.
- Iphigenia is a 1977 rendering of the prologue to the Trojan War where Agamemnon sacrifices his daughter to appease Artemis before sailing to Troy.
- The Trojan Women (1971), an adaptation of Euripides' play directed by Michael Cacoyannis and starring Katharine Hepburn as Hecuba, Vanessa Redgrave as Andromache, Geneviève Bujold as Cassandra and Irene Papas as Helen.
- Troy (2004), by Wolfgang Petersen, starring Brad Pitt as Achilles, Sean Bean as Odysseus, Eric Bana as Hector, Orlando Bloom as Paris, Diane Kruger as Helen and Peter O'Toole as Priam.
- The Return (2024), stars Ralph Fiennes as Odysseus.
- The Odyssey (2026), by Christopher Nolan, begins with the climax of the Trojan War.

== Opera ==
- Il ritorno di Ulisse in patria by Claudio Monteverdi, composed in 1641, after Homer.
- Dido and Aeneas by Henry Purcell, composed 1688, after Virgil.
- Achilles by John Gay, composed in 1733
- Les Troyens by Hector Berlioz, composed 1856–8 after Virgil.
- La belle Hélène by Jacques Offenbach composed in 1864
- Troilus and Cressida by William Walton composed 1947–1954 after Chaucer.
- King Priam by Michael Tippett, composed 1958–61 after Homer.

== Television and radio ==
- The Myth Makers, a 1965 Doctor Who serial, depicted the last days of the war satirically.
- In Search of the Trojan War, a six part BBC miniseries originally aired in 1985 hosted by the historian Michael Wood
- Time Commanders, a BBC television programme about ancient battle strategy, fought out the battle of Troy in one episode.
- The Time Tunnel episode "Revenge Of The Gods" (aired 21 October 1966) involves the American protagonists arriving at the final stage of the war and helping the Greeks to conquer and destroy Troy.
- Operation Lightning Pegasus, a satirical version by Alick Rowe, first broadcast on BBC Radio 4 in 1981.
- The Xena: Warrior Princess episode "Beware of Greeks bearing Gifts" (aired 15 January 1996) involves Xena and Gabrielle arriving at Troy during the Trojan War when the warrior princess' help is required by her old friend Helen.
- The Odyssey (1997), a two-part NBC miniseries starring Armand Assante.
- Troy, a trilogy of radio plays, starring Paul Scofield as "Hermes", first broadcast in 1998.
- Helen of Troy (2003), a miniseries starring Rufus Sewell as Agamemnon and Sienna Guillory as Helen.
- The Phineas and Ferb episode "Troy Story" (aired 20 September 2013) involves the boys reenactment of the Trojan War but with a Phineas and Ferb twist.
- The Last Days of Troy, a two-part 2015 BBC Radio 4 adaptation by Simon Armitage completing Homer's Iliad and Virgil's Aeneid, originally directed for The Royal Exchange Theatre by Nick Bagnall and directed for radio by Susan Roberts.
- Troy: Fall of a City, a 2018 miniseries co-produced by BBC One and Netflix.
- The Marvel Cinematic Universe animated miniseries Eyes of Wakanda episode "Legends and Lies", tells a Wakandan War Dog named B'Kai undercover as Memnon allied with Achilles to infiltrate Troy for retrieve a stolen vibranium pendant that Helen of Troy is wearing.

== Comics and graphic novels ==
- The Third Argument (1995), a Serbian graphic novel based on the writings of Milorad Pavić, with script by Zoran Stefanović and art by Zoran Tucić, published in USA by Heavy Metal Magazine (1998–2000)
- Age of Bronze an ongoing series by writer and artist Eric Shanower, published by Image Comics.
  - Age of Bronze volume 1: A Thousand Ships (2001), in collecting issues #1–9. ISBN 978-1-58240-200-0.
  - Age of Bronze volume 2: Sacrifice (2005), collecting issues #10 - 19. ISBN 978-1-58240-399-1.
  - Age of Bronze volume 3: Betrayal, Part One (2007). ISBN 978-1-58240-755-5.
- Marvel Illustrated
  - The Iliad (2008) (Hardcover), ISBN 978-0-7851-2383-5, collecting issues #1–8, adapted by Roy Thomas and Miguel Angel Sepulveda from the epic poem.
  - The Odyssey (2009) (Hardcover), ISBN 978-0-7851-1908-1, collecting issues #1–8, adapted by Roy Thomas and Greg Tocchini from the epic poem.
  - The Trojan War (2009) (Hardcover), ISBN 978-0-7851-3862-4, collecting issues #1–5, adapted by Roy Thomas and Miguel Angel Sepulveda based on Epic Cycle and other ancient sources.
- The Trojan War app (2013) (App Store (iOS) application), published by Kichigai Editions.

== Video games ==
- Gates of Troy a turn based strategy expansion for the game Spartan, by Matrix Games and Slitherine Soft, released in 2004.
- The Trojan War appears a scenario in the Greek campaign for the RTS computer game Empire Earth.
- Age of Mythology, an RTS game by Ensemble Studios and Microsoft released in 2002, in which several missions deal with the capture of Troy.
- "Warriors: Legends of Troy" is a hack and slash game developed by a Canadian branch of Tecmo Koei. Released on consoles in 2011, the game is centered around the events of the Trojan War.
- Zeus: Master of Olympus features an adventure centered around the events of the Trojan War.
- Age of Empires Online, an MMORTS game published by Microsoft, contains missions relating to the Trojan War.
- The Settlers IV, an RTS game by Blue Byte, features the Trojans as a playable race in its expansion pack.
- Total War Saga: Troy a 2020 strategy game of the Total War series.
