= Gene (given name) =

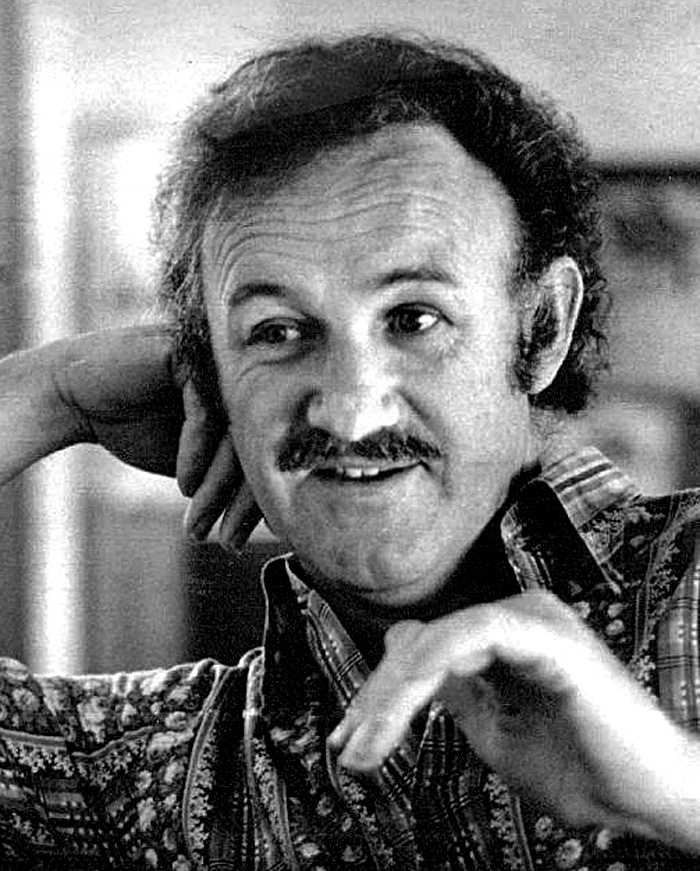
- Gene Hackman in 1972
- Pronunciation: /ˈdʒiːn/
- Gender: Unisex
- Language: English

Origin
- Languages: Greek, French, and English
- Origin: 1. Eugene; 2. Genevieve
- Region of origin: Greece; France; England

Other names
- Related names: Eugene, Eugenia, Eugénie, Eugenio, Genevieve, Geneva

Gene is a unisex given name. It is often a short form (hypocorism) of Eugene or Genevieve.

Notable people with the name include:

== Men ==
=== Gene ===
- Gene Abel, American psychiatrist and controversial clinician
- Gene Bradley (born 1957), American football player
- Gene Charron (born 1942), American politician
- Gene A. Cretz (born 1950), American politician
- Gene Davidson (1896–1960), American football and baseball player
- Gene Englund (1917–1995), American professional basketball player
- Gene F. Franklin (1927–2012), American engineer and control theorist
- Gene Makowsky (born 1973), Canadian Football League player and politician
- Gene Miles (born 1959), Australian rugby league footballer
- Gene Moore (window dresser) (1910–1998), American designer and store window dresser
- Gene Noble, American singer and songwriter
- Gene Pitney (1940–2006), American singer-songwriter
- Gene Rayburn (1917–1999), American radio and television personality
- Gene Robillard (1929–2007), Canadian football player
- Gene Sarazen (1902–1999), American golfer
- Gene Simmons (born 1949), Israeli-American musician, singer, and songwriter
- Gene Smith (athletic director), athletic director at Ohio State University
- Gene Spafford (born 1956), American computer scientist and cybersecurity pioneer
- Gene Steratore (born 1963), former American football official in the National Football League
- Gene Ween (born 1970), American musician
- Gene Weingarten (born 1951), American humor writer and journalist
- Gene Wilder (1933–2016), American actor and comedian
- Gene Wolfe (1931–2019), American science fiction author

=== Eugene ===
- Gene Cockrell (1934–2020), American football player
- Gene Filipski (1931–1994), American football player
- Gene Gotti (born 1946), Italian-American mobster
- Gene Hackman (1930–2025), American actor
- Gene Kelly (1912–1996), American dancer and film star
- Gene Kranz (born 1933), American aerospace engineer and NASA Flight Director and manager
- Gene Mangan (1936–2025), Irish cyclist
- Gene Moore (outfielder) (1909–1978), right fielder in Major League Baseball
- Gene Moore (pitcher) (1886–1938), left-handed pitcher in Major League Baseball
- Gene Moore (basketball) (born 1945), American Basketball Association player
- Gene Okerlund (1942–2019), American professional wrestling announcer
- Gene Prebola (1938–2021), American football player
- Gene Quaw, (1891–1968), American musician
- Gene Quill (1927–1988), American jazz alto saxophonist
- Gene Quintano (born 1946), American screenwriter, actor, producer, and director
- Gene Roddenberry, (1921–1991), American television screenwriter and producer
- Gene Samuel (born 1960), Trinidad and Tobago road bicycle racer and track cyclist
- Gene Siskel (1946–1999), American film critic
- Gene Snitsky (born 1970), American professional wrestler
- Gene Sobchuk (born 1951), Canadian ice hockey player
- Gene Stuart, (1944–2016), Irish singer
- Gene Upshaw (1945–2008), American National Football League (NFL) player and former NFL Players Association director

== Women ==
=== Gene ===
- Gene Anderson (actress) (1931–1965), English actress
- Gene Cohen Boyer (1925–2003), American women's rights activist
- Gene Bradford (1909–1937), American politician
- Gene Damon (1933–2011), American writer and publisher
- Gene Derwood (1909–1954), American poet and painter
- Gene Field Foster (1917–1983), American carpenter, artist, anthropologist, ornithologist, and early Glen Canyon river runner
- Genė Galinytė (born 1945), Lithuanian rower
- Gene Grabeel (1920–2015), American mathematician and cryptanalyst
- Gene Hatch, American businesswoman
- Gene Nora Jessen (1937–2024), American aviator and a member of Mercury 13
- Gene Joseph, is a Wet'suwet'en Nadleh'dena First Nations librarian from Nagwilget, British Columbia
- Gene Kemp (1926–2015), English author
- Eugenia Kennicott (1883–1934), recorded her life in Colorado in early 19th century in rare photographic plates
- Gene Kloss (1903–1996), American artist
- Gene Miles (activist) (1930–1972), political activist from Trinidad and Tobago
- Gene E. K. Pratter (1949–2024), American judge
- Gene Sherman (art specialist) (born 1947), philanthropist, academic and expert on art, fashion and architecture
- Gene Solia-Gibb (born 1983), Samoan New Zealand netball and rugby player
- Gene Stratton-Porter (1863–1924), American writer, nature photographer, and naturalist
- Gene Tierney (1920–1991), American actress
- Gene Weltfish (1902–1980), American anthropologist and historian

=== Genevieve ===
- Genevieve Grotjan Feinstein (1913–2006), American mathematician and cryptanalyst
- Gene Gauntier (1885–1966), American screenwriter and actress
- Genevieve George (1927–2002), Canadian baseball player
- Genevieve or Gene Lynch (1891–1960), American painter and art teacher
- Gene Ritchie Monahan (1908–1994), American portrait and landscape artist
- Genevieve or Gene Roberts (1926–2018), stage name Meg Randall, American actress
- Gene Segerblom (1918–2013), American politician
- Gene Visich (1926–2012), American baseball player

== See also ==
- Gene (disambiguation)
- Jean (disambiguation)
- Gene-Ann Polk (1926–2015), American physician and hospital administrator and professor of pediatrics
