= Star-crossed (disambiguation) =

"Star-crossed" is a phrase describing a pair of lovers whose relationship is often thwarted by outside forces.

Star-crossed or starcrossed may also refer to:

== Film and television ==
- Starcrossed (2005 film), an independent short film
- Starcrossed (2014 film), a film starring Mischa Barton
- Starcrossed, a 1985 television film starring James Spader
- Star-Crossed (TV series), a 2014 television series on The CW
- "Star-Crossed" (Grimm), a 2016 television episode
- "Star-Crossed" (Quantum Leap), a 1989 television episode
- "Star-Crossed" (Supergirl) a 2017 television episode
- "Star-Crossed" (Tru Calling), a 2003 television episode
- "Starcrossed" (Justice League episode), a 2004 three-part series finale
- Starcrossed, a TV show in the film A Dog's Breakfast

== Literature ==
- Star Crossed (comics), a comic book limited series published by the DC Comics imprint, Helix
- Starcrossed (novel), a 2011 novel by Josephine Angelini
- The Starcrossed, a 1975 science fiction novel by Ben Bova
- Starcrossed, a science fiction novel by Brenda Hiatt

== Music ==
- Star-Crossed (album), a 2021 album by Kacey Musgraves and the title song
- Starcrossed, a 2000 album by Maggie Reilly
- "Starcrossed" (song), a 2004 single by the Irish alternative rock group Ash
- Star crossed, a song from the 2007 album Scary Kids Scaring Kids

== Art ==
- Star-Crossed, a public sculpture by Nancy Holt

== Games ==
- Star Crossed (game), a tabletop game by Alex Roberts (game designer)

== See also ==
- Starcross, a riverside village in Devon, England
- Starcross (video game), a 1982 interactive fiction game
- Starcross (novel), a 2007 young adult novel by Philip Reeve
- Star-crossed lovers (disambiguation)
