= The Seege of Troye =

The Seege of Troye or The Batayle of Troye is a Middle English poem, the earliest in English of numerous medieval retellings of the Trojan War in art and literature. Somewhat crudely it thoroughly blends its two main sources, Dares Phrygius and Benoît de Sainte-Maure's Roman de Troie, and draws upon the Rawlinson Excidium Troie for episodes of the youth of Paris. The poem survives in four manuscripts, among the Harleian manuscripts (MS 525), at Lincoln's Inn (MS 150), Egerton MS 2862, and College of Arms Arundel MS 22.

The poem contains a lengthy and repetitive account of the Judgement of Paris, which is recounted by Paris to the assembled Trojans.
