= Whom the Gods Would Destroy (disambiguation) =

Whom the Gods Would Destroy is a 1970 novel by Richard P. Powell.

Whom the Gods Would Destroy or Whom (the) Gods Destroy may also refer to:

- "Whom the gods would destroy, they first make mad", a phrase used in English literature since at least the 17th century

== Film and television ==
- Whom the Gods Destroy (1916 film), an American silent drama film
- Whom the Gods Destroy (1934 film), an American drama film
- Whom the Gods Would Destroy (film), a 1919 American film
- "Whom Gods Destroy" (Star Trek: The Original Series), a 1969 television episode
- "Whom the Gods Would Destroy" (Lewis), a 2007 television episode

== Literature ==
- Whom Gods Destroy (comics), a 1996 comic book series by Chris Claremont
- The Mighty Thor: I, Whom The Gods Would Destroy, a 1988 graphic novel in the Marvel Graphic Novel line
- Spider-Girl: Whom Gods Destroy, a 2009 chapter of The Spectacular Spider-Girl by Tom DeFalco and Ron Frenz

== Other ==
- Whom Gods Destroy (band), an American progressive metal band

== See also ==
- Those Whom the Gods Detest, a 2009 album by Nile
