= Gene (disambiguation) =

A gene is a sequence of DNA or RNA that codes for a molecule that has a function.

Gene or Genes also may refer to:

== Given name ==
- Gene (given name)
- Gene, a variation of Eugenia (given name)
- Gene Autry (1907–1998), American singer-songwriter, actor, businessman
- Gene Eugene, American singer, songwriter and producer Gene Andrusco (1961–2000)
- Gene Simmons, stage name of Gene Klein (born 1949), American musician and member of Kiss
- James Gene Tunney (1897–1978), Irish-American boxer and world heavyweight boxing champion
- Gene Vincent, American rock and roll and rockabilly singer and musician Vincent Eugene Craddock (1935–1971)
- Gene Wilder, stage name of American actor Jerome Silberman (1933–2016)
- Gene Okerlund, former professional wrestling interviewer and ring announcer (1942-2019)

== Arts and entertainment ==
=== Fictional characters ===
- Gene Belcher, on the television series Bob's Burgers
- Gene Forrester, in A Separate Peace
- Gene Hunt, on the British science fiction/police procedural drama series Life on Mars and its sequel, Ashes to Ashes
- Gene Marshall, a collectible fashion doll
- Gene, the main antagonist in Metal Gear Solid: Portable Ops
- Gene, the main character in God Hand
- Gene, the main character in The Emoji Movie
- Gene Takavic, an alias used by the character Saul Goodman in the television series Better Call Saul

=== Music ===
- Gene (band), English indie/rock quartet who rose to prominence in the mid-1990s
- Genes (album) (2003) by Irish artist Dave Couse

=== Other arts and entertainment ===
- Genes (game show), Tamil language game show
- Gene (novel), a novel by Stel Pavlou
- The Gene: An Intimate History, a 2016 popular science book by Siddhartha Mukherjee

== Geography ==
- Gene fornby, a reconstructed Roman Iron Age village near Örnsköldsvik, Sweden
- Gênes, historic department of the French Consulate and of the First French Empire in present-day Italy

== Journals ==
- Gene (journal), established in 1976 and published by Elsevier
- Genes (journal), established in 2010 and published by MDPI

== See also ==
- Gené (disambiguation)
