= Star-crossed lovers (disambiguation) =

Star-crossed lovers is a term referring to a pair of lovers whose relationship is often thwarted by outside forces.

Star-crossed lovers may also refer to:

- Star-Crossed Lovers, a 1962 East German romantic war drama film directed by Frank Beyer
- "Starcrossed Lovers", a 1986 song by Siouxsie and the Banshees
- "Star Crossed Lovers", a 2016 song by Barry Gibb
- "Star Crossed Lovers", a 1970 song by Craig Scott
- "The Star-Crossed Lovers", a 1957 song by Duke Ellington
- "Star-Crossed Lovers", a 2021 song by John Smith
- "Star Crossed Lovers", a 1968 song by Neil Sedaka
- "Star Crossed Lovers", a 2023 song by Savage Grace
- "Star Crossed Lover", a 2024 song by Hannah Grae
- "Star Crossed Lovers" (Upstart Crow), a 2016 television episode

== See also ==
- Star-crossed (disambiguation)
