= Gené =

Gené may refer to:

People

- Eric Gené (born 2007), Spanish racing driver
- Giuseppe Gené (1800–1847), Italian naturalist and author
- Jordi Gené (born 1970), Spanish racing driver
- Marc Gené (born 1974), Spanish racing driver

Places

- Gené, Maine-et-Loire, a commune in the Maine-et-Loire department in France

== See also ==
- Gene (disambiguation)
- Genet (disambiguation)
