= KCMM =

- Belgrade, Montana; United States
- Broadcast area: Bozeman, Montana
- Frequency: 99.1 MHz
- Branding: The One

Programming
- Format: Christian Contemporary
- Affiliations: I Notable Personalities: Lee Stevens (Williams) Operations Manager/ Morning Show 2001

Ownership
- Owner: Gallatin Valley Witness Inc.

Technical information
- Licensing authority: FCC
- Facility ID: 87888
- Class: C3
- ERP: 25,000 watts
- HAAT: 62 meters (204 feet)
- Transmitter coordinates: 45°46′15″N 111°13′26″W

Links
- Public license information: Public file; LMS
- Website: http://www.kcmmtheone.com/

KCMM (99.1 FM, "The One") is a radio station licensed to serve Belgrade, Montana. The station is owned by Gallatin Valley Witness Inc. It airs a Christian Contemporary music format.

The station was assigned the KCMM call letters by the Federal Communications Commission on April 12, 2000.
