= Brooke Williams (netball) =

New Zealand netball player

Brooke Amber Williams (born 23 December 1982) is a New Zealand netball player who plays as a centre and wing attack. She has represented Samoa internationally as part of the Samoa national netball team. She is married to rugby league player Sione Lousi.

Williams played for the Western Flyers in the National Bank Cup. In 2019, she moved to Townsville, Australia, with her partner, Sione Lousi, and began playing for the Northern Rays in the HART Sapphire Series.

Williams was part of the Samaon team for the 2007 World Netball Championships in Auckland, and later for the 2015 Netball World Cup. She was part of the bronze medal-winning Samoan team at the 2015 Pacific Games in Port Moresby. She co-captained Samoa at the 2019 Netball World Cup alongside Gene Solia-Gibb, and retired from international netball after that tournament.
