= Peter Le Neve =

English herald and antiquary

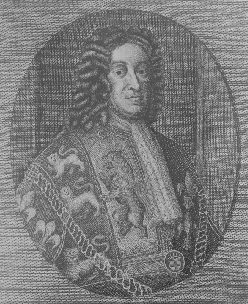
- Born: 21 January 1661
- Died: 24 September 1729 (aged 68)
- Occupations: Herald, antiquary

Peter Le Neve FSA FRS (21 January 1661 – 24 September 1729) was an English herald and antiquary. He was appointed Rouge Dragon Pursuivant 17 January 1690 and created Norroy King at Arms on 25 May 1704. From 1707 to 1721 he was Richmond Herald of Arms in Ordinary, an officer of arms of the College of Arms. He was a Fellow and first President of the Society of Antiquaries of London and a Fellow of the Royal Society.

Among his library's holdings was a volume of fragments that found its way into the collection of Richard Rawlinson and thence to the Bodleian Library, Oxford, that contains the so-called "Rawlinson Excidium Troie", a unique testimony to a Latin account of the Trojan War that was used by many medieval writers.

Peter Le Neve was the son of Francis Neve, citizen and Draper of London, by Avice, daughter of Peter Wright. He was the brother of Oliver Le Neve.
