= Belgrade, Montana =

City in Montana, United States

- City
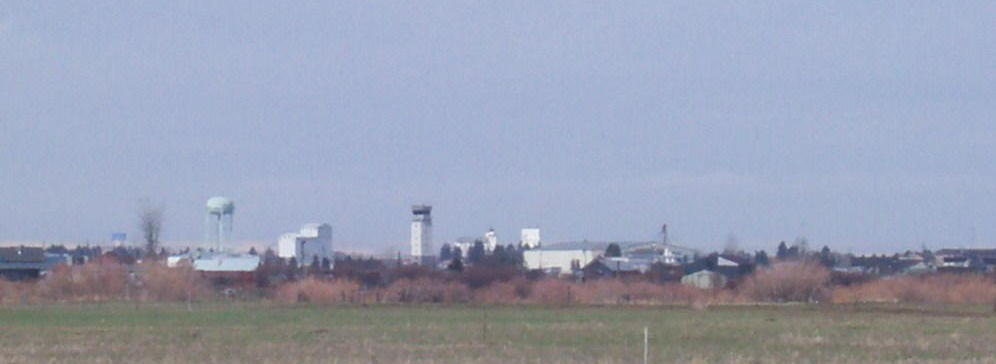
- Belgrade as seen from Airport Road

- Seal

- Location of Belgrade, Montana
- Coordinates: 45°46′48.91″N 111°10′30.82″W
- Country: United States
- State: Montana
- County: Gallatin
- Founded: 1881
- Incorporated: 1906

Government
  - Mayor: Russell C. Nelson
  - Deputy mayor: Michael Meis
  - City Council: Renae Mattimoe; Kristine Menicucci; Erin Bell; Jim Simon; Jason Guffey

Area
  - Total: 4.865 sq mi (12.600 km^{2})
  - Land: 4.865 sq mi (12.600 km^{2})
  - Water: 0 sq mi (0.000 km^{2})
- Elevation: 4,449 ft (1,356 m)

Population (2020)
  - Total: 10,460
  - Estimate (2025): 13,107
  - Density: 2,571/sq mi (992.8/km^{2})
- Time zone: UTC−7 (Mountain (MST))
  - Summer (DST): UTC−6 (MDT)
- ZIP Code: 59714
- Area code: 406
- FIPS code: 30-04975
- GNIS feature ID: 2409815
- Website: belgrademt.gov

Belgrade is a city in Gallatin County, Montana, United States. The population was 10,460 at the 2020 census, and was estimated to be 13,107 in 2025. Belgrade is part of the Bozeman, MT Metropolitan statistical area. It is the most populous city in Montana that is not a county seat.

Belgrade and the surrounding areas experienced a significant population growth from 2010 to 2020. The 2010 city population from the US Census was 7,389, over 3,000 fewer than in 2020. The 59714 ZIP Code, which is the city and surrounding commercial and residential developments, had populations of 18,182 as of the 2010 census, 22,333 as of the 2020 census, and 23,897 as of 2023 estimate.

== History ==
The original townsite of Belgrade was established in 1883 when the Northern Pacific Railroad was constructed through the Gallatin Valley. The original town plat was filed in the Gallatin County Clerk and Recorder's Office by Thomas B. Quaw, a businessman from the midwest, in July 1891. According to Quaw, the townsite was an unmanned railroad siding 9.7 miles west of Bozeman, and was named Belgrade after the capital of Serbia, as an expression of appreciation to the Serbian investors who helped finance a portion of the Northern Pacific Railroad. Quaw and William O. Tracy created the Belgrade Grain and Produce Company and marketed Belgrade as the "Princess of the Prairies."

The post office was established in 1887 with Quaw as postmaster. Belgrade was incorporated in 1906.

== Geography ==
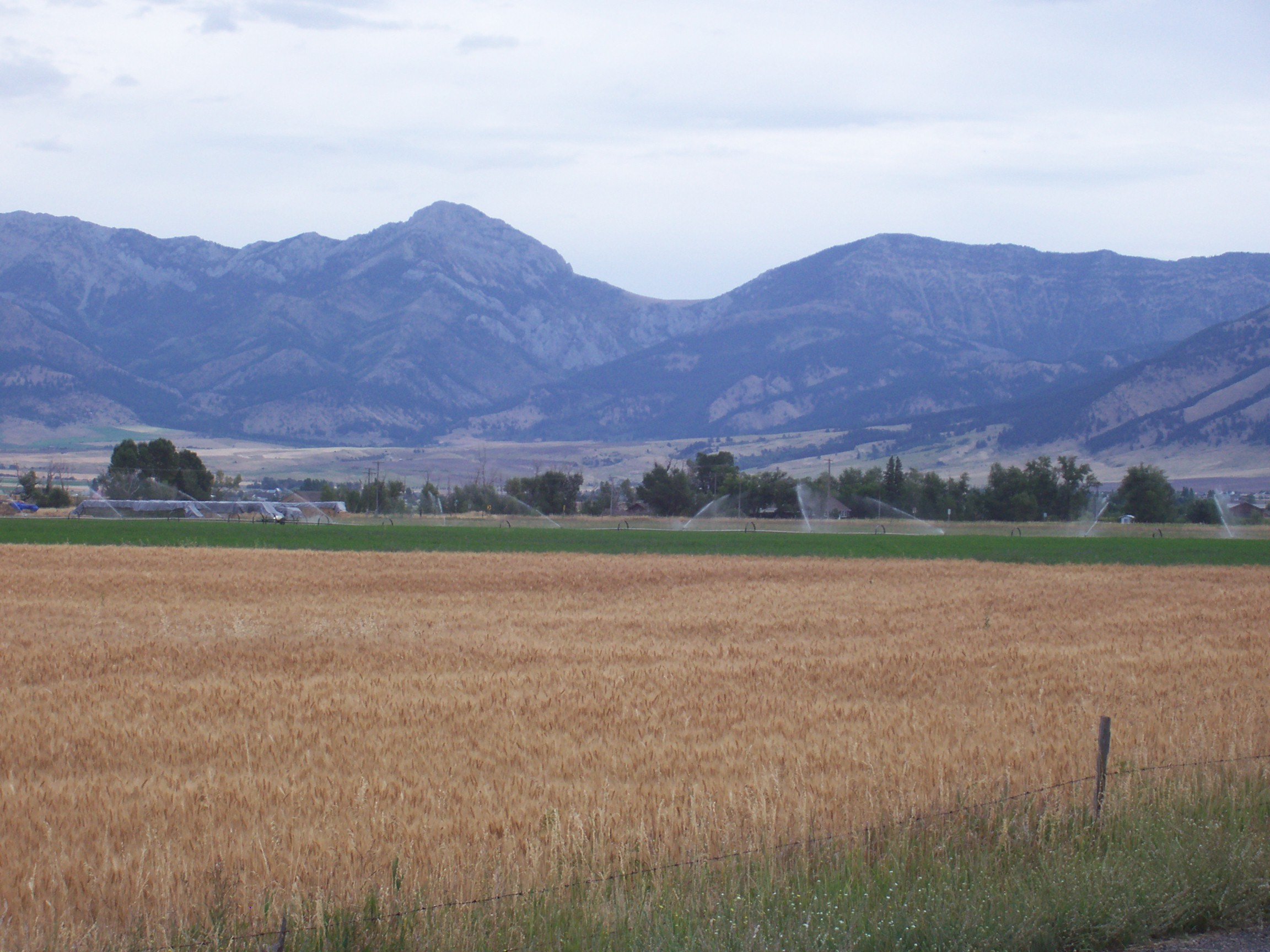
The Bridger Mountains just outside Belgrade

Belgrade is located at 45°46′48.91″N 111°10′30.82″W (45.7802541, -111.1752267).

According to the United States Census Bureau, the city has a total area of 4.865 square miles (12.60 km^{2}), all land.

== Demographics ==
Historical population
Census	Pop.	Note	%±
1880	30		—
1910	561		—
1920	499		−11.1%
1930	533		6.8%
1940	618		15.9%
1950	663		7.3%
1960	1,057		59.4%
1970	1,307		23.7%
1980	2,336		78.7%
1990	3,411		46.0%
2000	5,728		67.9%
2010	7,389		29.0%
2020	10,460		41.6%
2025 (est.)	13,107		25.3%
U.S. Decennial Census; 2020 Census

=== Racial and ethnic composition ===
Belgrade, Montana – racial and ethnic composition Note: the US Census treats Hispanic/Latino as an ethnic category. This table excludes Latinos from the racial categories and assigns them to a separate category. Hispanics/Latinos may be of any race.
Race / ethnicity (NH = non-Hispanic)	Pop. 2000	Pop. 2010	Pop. 2020	% 2000	% 2010	% 2020
White alone (NH)	5,473	6,824	8,873	95.55%	92.35%	84.83%
Black or African American alone (NH)	5	22	43	0.09%	0.30%	0.41%
Native American or Alaska Native alone (NH)	58	70	96	1.01%	0.95%	0.92%
Asian alone (NH)	17	39	68	0.30%	0.53%	0.65%
Pacific Islander alone (NH)	4	9	9	0.07%	0.12%	0.09%
Other race alone (NH)	2	2	55	0.03%	0.03%	0.53%
Mixed race or multiracial (NH)	58	145	543	1.01%	1.96%	5.19%
Hispanic or Latino (any race)	111	278	773	1.94%	3.76%	7.39%
Total	5,728	7,389	10,460	100.00%	100.00%	100.00%

=== 2020 census ===
As of the 2020 census, Belgrade had a population of 10,460. The median age was 32.1 years. 25.1% of residents were under the age of 18 and 8.6% were 65 years of age or older. For every 100 females there were 107.5 males, and for every 100 females age 18 and over there were 108.5 males age 18 and over.

99.6% of residents lived in urban areas, while 0.4% lived in rural areas.

There were 4,102 households in the city, including 2,649 families. Of all households, 35.0% had children under the age of 18 living in them, 48.1% were married-couple households, 21.6% were households with a male householder and no spouse or partner present, and 19.7% were households with a female householder and no spouse or partner present. About 23.9% of all households were made up of individuals and 6.0% had someone living alone who was 65 years of age or older.

There were 4,339 housing units; 5.5% were vacant, with a homeowner vacancy rate of 2.8% and a rental vacancy rate of 4.3%. The population density was 2,560.6 inhabitants per square mile (988.7/km^{2}), and the housing unit density was 1,062.2 per square mile (410.1/km^{2}).

=== Demographic estimates ===
As of the 2023 American Community Survey, there are 4,727 estimated households in Belgrade with an average of 2.41 persons per household. The city has a median household income of $88,896. Approximately 12.6% of the city's population lives at or below the poverty line. Belgrade has an estimated 77.7% employment rate, with 37.4% of the population holding a bachelor's degree or higher and 96.4% holding a high school diploma.

The top five reported ancestries (people were allowed to report up to two ancestries, thus the figures will generally add to more than 100%) were English (95.2%), Spanish (4.0%), Indo-European (0.8%), Asian and Pacific Islander (0.0%), and Other (0.0%).

The median age in the city was 33.2 years.

=== 2010 census ===
As of the 2010 census, there were 7,389 people, 2,965 households, and 1,877 families residing in the city. The population density was 2,272.1 inhabitants per square mile (877.3/km^{2}). There were 3,174 housing units at an average density of 976.6 per square mile (377.1/km^{2}). The racial makeup of the city was 94.18% White, 0.35% African American, 1.03% Native American, 0.54% Asian, 0.14% Pacific Islander, 1.23% from some other races and 2.53% from two or more races. Hispanic or Latino people of any race were 3.76% of the population.

Of the 2,965 households 38.3% had children under the age of 18 living with them, 48.4% were married couples living together, 10.2% had a female householder with no husband present, 4.7% had a male householder with no wife present, and 36.7% were non-families. 26.8% of households were one person and 5% were one person aged 65 or older. The average household size was 2.49 and the average family size was 3.07.

The median age was 30.8 years. 27.5% of residents were under the age of 18; 9.5% were between the ages of 18 and 24; 35.9% were from 25 to 44; 21.5% were from 45 to 64; and 5.7% were 65 or older. The gender makeup of the city was 50.5% male and 49.5% female.

=== 2000 census ===
As of the 2000 census, there were 5,728 people, 2,132 households, and 1,507 families residing in the city. The population density was 3,429.8 inhabitants per square mile (1,324.3/km^{2}). There were 2,239 housing units at an average density of 1,340.6 per square mile (517.6/km^{2}). The racial makeup of the city was 96.49% White, 0.09% African American, 1.06% Native American, 0.30% Asian, 0.09% Pacific Islander, 0.79% from some other races and 1.19% from two or more races. Hispanic or Latino people of any race were 1.94% of the population.

Of the 2,132 households 41.6% had children under the age of 18 living with them, 56.9% were married couples living together, 10.1% had a female householder with no husband present, and 29.3% were non-families. 19.8% of households were one person and 5.1% were one person aged 65 or older. The average household size was 2.68 and the average family size was 3.12.

The age distribution was 29.7% under the age of 18, 11.5% from 18 to 24, 37.3% from 25 to 44, 15.5% from 45 to 64, and 6.1% 65 or older. The median age was 29 years. For every 100 females there were 101.7 males. For every 100 females age 18 and over, there were 99.1 males.

The median household income was $37,392 and the median family income was $40,378. Males had a median income of $27,154 versus $20,689 for females. The per capita income for the city was $15,266. About 8.1% of families and 11.4% of the population were below the poverty line, including 15.7% of those under age 18 and 7.1% of those age 65 or over.

== Economy ==
As one of the largest high school athletic facilities in the state, the Belgrade Special Events Center hosts numerous district, divisional, and state athletic events. These sporting events bring thousands of people to town who not only attend the games, but shop in area stores, stay in local motels, and eat in local restaurants.

Corporate offices for large companies are in Belgrade. Under Canvas Group provides a glamping experience in 11 locations. Xtant Medical designs, manufactures and distributes medical devices and human tissues for transplant.

CACI International is a major employer. The electronic warfare company purchased Belgrade based Ascent Vision Technology in 2020. They continue to be one of the largest employers in Belgrade.

Given the short distance to Bozeman, many residents commute for employment.

== Government ==
Belgrade is governed via the mayor council system. The city council consists of six members who are elected from one of three wards. Each ward elects two members. The mayor is elected in a citywide vote.

Russ Nelson served as mayor for 22 years until choosing not to run for re-election in 2025. Michael Meis, the deputy mayor, was unopposed in the 2025 mayoral election.

== Education ==
It is in Belgrade Elementary School District and the Belgrade High School District. The Belgrade elementary and high school districts are part of Belgrade Public Schools.

Belgrade School District educates students from kindergarten through 12th grade. Belgrade High School's team name is the Panthers.

== Arts and culture ==
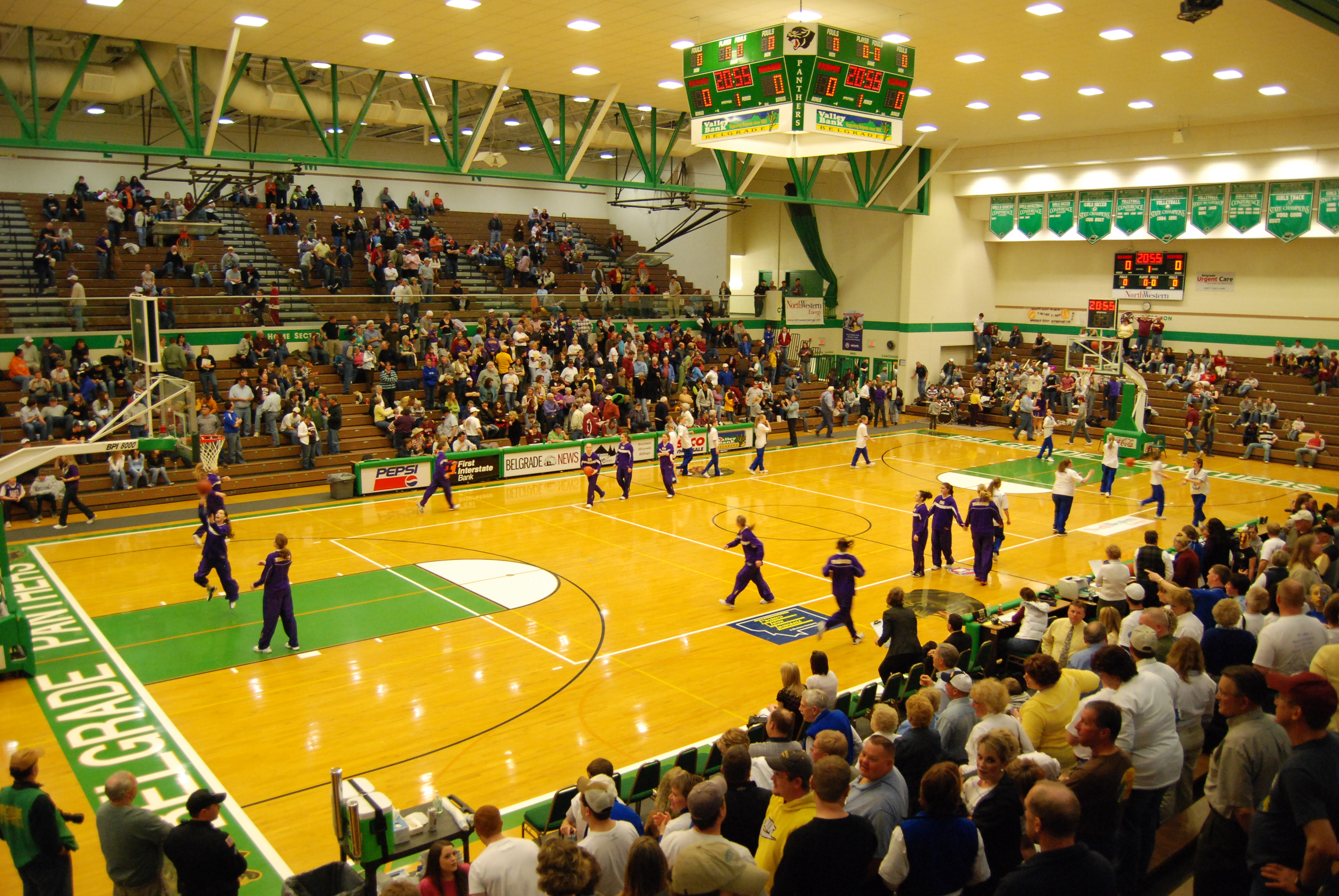
The Belgrade Special Events Center

The Belgrade Special Events Center is a 4,800-seat indoor facility constructed by the Belgrade School District in 1996. The building is used for school and community events. In March 2010 the facility hosted the State B Girls Basketball Tournament.

The Gallatin Speedway is located on the outskirts of Belgrade. The 3/8-mile (600 m) dirt oval track hosts stock car racing events from May to September.

The Belgrade Fall Festival is an annual tradition that takes place on Homecoming Weekend, typically the third weekend in September. The day's activities include a parade, community open-pit beef barbecue, car show, arts and crafts fair at Lewis and Clark Park, and the Belgrade High School Panthers varsity football game.

Belgrade has a public library, the Belgrade Community Library.

== Media ==
The Belgrade News is a newspaper available either by print or online. It is published twice weekly.

Radio stations licensed in Belgrade are KCMM and KISN. They are also served by the wider Bozeman area.

== Infrastructure ==
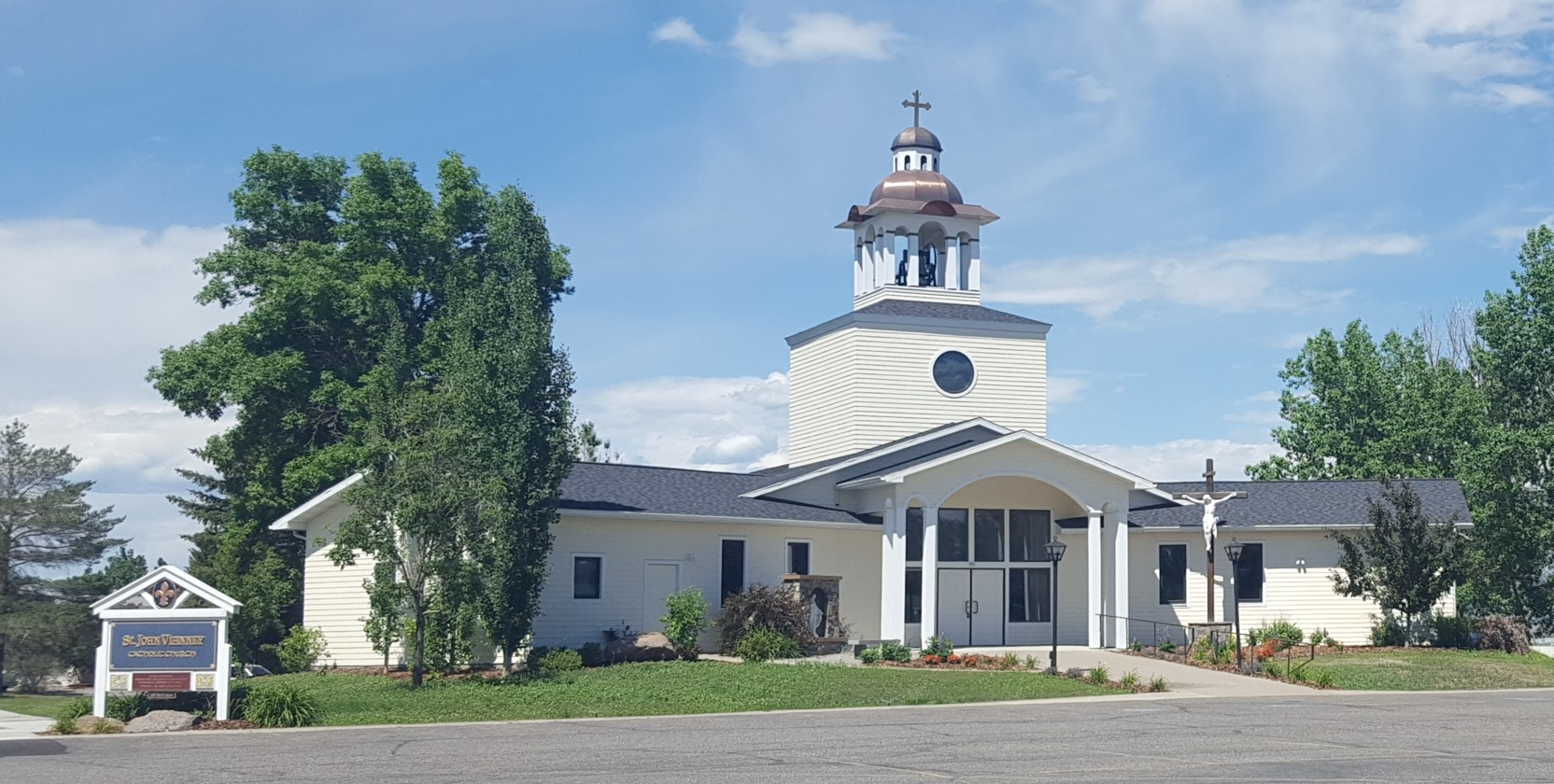
Saint John Vianney Catholic Church in Belgrade Montana, 2022

Belgrade is located along Interstate 90. Montana Highway 85 enters town from the south.

Bozeman Yellowstone International Airport is located adjacent to the city boundaries.

Bozeman Health operates a Belgrade clinic. It provides primary care as well as physical therapy and laboratory services. BestMed Urgent Care delivers urgent care services. They also administer vaccinations and immunizations and have some medications on-site.

== Notable people ==
- Steve Daines, U.S. senator; former U.S. congressman
- Gene Quaw (1891–1968), musician
- Philip Winchester, Actor
