= The Young Philadelphians =

1959 film by Vincent Sherman

- Theatrical release poster
- Directed by: Vincent Sherman
- Screenplay by: James Gunn
- Based on: The Philadelphian; 1956 novel by Richard P. Powell
- Produced by: James Gunn
- Starring: Paul Newman; Barbara Rush; Alexis Smith; Robert Vaughn
- Cinematography: Harry Stradling
- Edited by: William H. Ziegler
- Music by: Ernest Gold
- Distributed by: Warner Bros. Pictures
- Release date: May 19, 1959 (Philadelphia)
- Running time: 136 minutes
- Country: United States
- Language: English
- Box office: $2.8 million (est. US/ Canada rentals)

The Young Philadelphians is a 1959 American legal drama film directed by Vincent Sherman and starring Paul Newman, Barbara Rush, Robert Vaughn and Alexis Smith. The film is based on the 1956 novel The Philadelphian, by Richard P. Powell.

== Plot ==
It is 1924. Newlywed Kate Judson Lawrence is distraught to discover on her wedding night that her upper-class Philadelphia Main Line husband, William, never really wanted to marry her, when he says, "It was my mother who wanted this marriage, to give her a grandson. But I can't love you, Kate, I can't love anyone", presumably because of his unconfessed homosexuality.

After William leaves her that night, she seeks comfort from longtime working-class friend and former beau Mike Flanagan. The next day, Kate learns that William died of an apparent suicide in a car wreck. Nine months later, Kate gives birth to a son, Anthony Judson "Tony" Lawrence. She is visited by William's mother, who has become aware that Flanagan was Tony's father. She offers money to Kate if she will not raise her son as a Lawrence, but she refuses, and is cut off from the family money.

Years later, Tony is a smart, ambitious Princeton University student working his way through college for Flanagan as a construction worker, aiming to become a lawyer. One day, he encounters socialite Joan Dickinson when she has a minor car accident. They soon fall in love, though Joan is expected by nearly everyone in her lofty social circle to marry millionaire Carter Henry. Their mutual friend, Chester "Chet" Gwynn, warns her not to let social pressure separate her from the one she loves as it did him.

They decide to elope. However, Joan's father Gilbert Dickinson persuades Tony to postpone the wedding by offering him invaluable career help and a job at the highly esteemed law firm of which he is a full partner. Believing Tony has allowed himself to be bought, a disillusioned Joan sails to Europe. When Carter follows her, she marries him. Devastated and angry, Tony realizes that Joan's father wanted her to marry into another wealthy family, and only offered Tony help with his career in the hope of breaking them up. Tony then devotes himself to working his way up the social ladder and learning the game of the wealthy.

Fellow student Louis Donetti tells Tony about a wonderful opportunity he has to assist John Marshall Wharton in writing a law book. Tony becomes acquainted with Wharton's much younger wife, Carol, and steals the job from his classmate. Living and working at Wharton's mansion, Tony impresses his employer with his expertise. Carol becomes attracted to him. She comes to his bedroom one night, but he cunningly defuses the dangerous situation by asking her to divorce her husband and marry him, knowing that she will be unwilling to do that.

Wharton offers Tony a job at his own prestigious firm. Tony accepts, deciding to specialize in the relatively new area of tax law, where there is more opportunity for rapid advancement. When the Korean War starts, interrupting his career, Tony serves as a JAG officer. Others are not as fortunate. Chet Gwynn loses an arm in combat, and Carter Henry is killed, leaving Joan a widow.

Upon returning home, Tony gets a lucky break. Forced to work over the Christmas holiday, he is available when the very rich Mrs. J. Arthur Allen needs her will amended. With his specialized knowledge, he shows her how to avoid paying a great deal of taxes. Mrs. Allen responds by designating Tony to manage her finances, instead of her longtime lawyer Gilbert Dickinson. Tony also begins mending his relationship with Joan. Success after success follows, and Tony becomes well known and respected by the Philadelphia elite.

One night, Tony is called to the police station to pick up Chet, his disheveled, drunken friend. Donetti (now a public prosecutor) has Chet taken into custody and charged with the first-degree murder of Morton Stearnes, Chet's uncle and tight-fisted guardian of his inheritance. Chet insists on Tony defending him, fearing that his relatives, particularly family patriarch Dr. Shippen Stearnes, are more interested in avoiding a scandal than proving his innocence. Despite having no experience with criminal law, Tony reluctantly agrees. His work is further complicated when Shippen Stearnes threatens to reveal that Tony's real father is Mike Flanagan if Tony embarrasses the Stearnes family. When Joan offers to hire a reliable attorney, Tony realizes that she fears that he has sold out once again.

At the murder trial, Tony discredits the testimony of Morton Stearnes's butler. Tony calls Shippen Stearnes to the stand and gets him to admit that Morton had a brain tumor, was mentally depressed, and that Morton's death might have been a suicide. The jury finds Chet not guilty. After the trial, Tony and Joan reconcile.

== Cast ==
- Paul Newman as Anthony "Tony" Judson Lawrence / Narrator
- Barbara Rush as Joan Dickinson
- Alexis Smith as Carol Wharton
- Brian Keith as Mike Flanagan
- Diane Brewster as Kate Judson Lawrence
- Billie Burke as Mrs. J. Arthur Allen, Owner Allen Oil Co.
- John Williams as Gilbert Dickinson
- Robert Vaughn as Chester A. "Chet" Gwynn
- Otto Kruger as John Marshall Wharton, Partner at the law firm of Wharton Biddle Clayton
- Paul Picerni as Louis Donetti
- Robert Douglas as Morton Stearnes
- Frank Conroy as Dr. Shippen Stearnes
- Adam West as William Lawrence III
- Anthony Eisley as Carter Henry
- Richard Deacon as George Archibald, Morton Stearnes's butler

== Production ==
Newman was not happy with the work he had been doing on film, despite his Academy Award nomination for Cat on a Hot Tin Roof, and had wanted to return to the stage, but he was forced to perform in Young Philadelphians by the contract he signed with Warner Bros. Pictures when he began making movies in 1955. Newman's biographer Shawn Levy describes the film as a "dreary nightmare" for the actor. He was opposed to making the film, and made that argument unsuccessfully to director Vincent Sherman. He only agreed to do the film so that Warner Bros. would give him time off to appear on stage in Tennessee Williams's new play Sweet Bird of Youth, and the play's producers moved the opening of the play to accommodate him.

For Vincent Sherman, the film marked a return to Warner Bros. after an eight-year absence during which he had gone to Europe to make movies. The film also helped launch the career of Robert Vaughn, who was nominated for an Academy Award for his performance.

The film was Newman's mother's favorite, and his biographer Lawrence J. Quirk believes that was because the character was very much like Newman in real life. Newman himself acknowledged that the role was "much closer to me as a human being" than most of the roles he played.

While he was making the film, Newman complained about the "wretched" script. At nights during filming, he and Vaughn worked with a writer to improve it, and he described the film as "just a glorified cosmopolitan soap opera."

According to film historian Peter Hanson, the script was ostensibly written by Ben L. Perry, who reported for work at Warner Bros. studios every day to disguise the fact that it was actually being written by the blacklisted writer Dalton Trumbo. Newman and Sherman, not knowing that Trumbo had written the script, tried to hire him to rewrite the script. Trumbo declined, citing other commitments, to avoid betraying the secret arrangement.

Young Philadelphians, Quirk points out, was "franker on the subject of homosexuality in some ways" than Cat on a Hot Tin Roof, in which Newman also starred, because it is strongly suggested that the William Lawrence character was gay.

The film had its premiere at the Stanley Theatre in Philadelphia on May 19, 1959. In its opening week, it finished second at the US box office, behind Some Like It Hot.

== Reception ==
The film has a 71% rating on the Rotten Tomatoes review aggregate site.

New York Times critic A.H. Weiler described the film as "sudsy" and said that "Although 'The Young Philadelphians' appears to be striving mightily to say something trenchant it only makes a surface social commentary." He called the film "an all-too-frequently pallid drama" and said it proves "that the trials and tribulations of the rich, like those of the poor, can be undramatic."

Writing in the Los Angeles Times, film critic Philip K. Scheuer praised Vaughn but said that the performances were otherwise not exceptional in a film that "chuffs and chugs along the Main Line for 130 minutes." Scheuer asserted that even the climactic trial sequence was overlong.

New York Daily News critic Dorothy Masters wrote that the essence of the Powell novel "seems to have vaporized" in coming to the screen. Sherman's direction, she said, "evokes more awe than empathy."

== Accolades ==
Award	Category	Nominee(s)	Result	Ref.
Academy Awards	Best Supporting Actor	Robert Vaughn	Nominated	
Academy Awards	Best Cinematography – Black-and-White	Harry Stradling	Nominated	
Academy Awards	Best Costume Design – Black-and-White	Howard Shoup	Nominated	
Golden Globe Awards	Best Supporting Actor – Motion Picture	Robert Vaughn	Nominated	
Laurel Awards	Top Male Supporting Performance	Robert Vaughn	4th Place	

The film is recognized by American Film Institute in these lists:

- 2008: AFI's 10 Top 10:
  - Nominated Courtroom Drama Film

== See also ==
- List of American films of 1959
