= Genet =

Genet or Genêt may refer to:

== Aircraft ==
- Armstrong Siddeley Genet, aircraft engine
- Armstrong Siddeley Genet Major, aircraft engine

== Animals and plants ==
- Genet (biology), a colony of plants, fungi or bacteria that come from a single genetic source
- Genet (animal), a small predatory Old World carnivore related to the civet

== People ==
- Genet (surname)
- Genêt, pen name of the New Yorker's Paris correspondent Janet Flanner

== Places ==
- Genet, Ethiopia, a town in southern Ethiopia

== See also ==
- Gené (disambiguation)
- Spanish jennet, a type of small horse
