= Pioneer, Go Home! =

1959 novel by Richard P. Powell

- First edition
- Author: Richard P. Powell
- Language: English
- Genre: Satire
- Publisher: Charles Scribner's Sons
- Publication date: 1959
- Publication place: United States
- Media type: Print
- Pages: 320 pp
- OCLC: 4840153

Pioneer, Go Home! is a satirical novel by Richard P. Powell, first published in 1959. The novel follows a New Jersey family, The Kwimpers, who move to Columbiana, a fictional state that resembles Florida, and squat on the side of a highway where a new bridge is being built, outraging local officials. The book was adapted into a play by Herman Raucher and also an Elvis Presley film, Follow that Dream (1962).

== 50th anniversary edition ==
In 2009 a 50th anniversary edition of Pioneer, Go Home! was released and includes a previously unpublished preface by the author.

== Plot summary ==
The Kwimper family of Cranberry County, New Jersey is on a vacation in Columbiana when their car runs out of gas. Somewhere along the way, the Kwimpers had made a wrong turn and ended up on an unfinished highway. While waiting for assistance to arrive they set up shacks on the side of the road.

The Kwimper clan consists of Pop Kwimper who has lived his entire life off government welfare programs such as unemployment compensation and Aid to Families with Dependent Children, his happy-go-lucky son Toby Kwimper (whose "Strength is as the strength of ten because his heart is pure"), adopted identical twins Eddy and Teddy that nobody can tell apart (and whose parents "tried to beat a train to a crossing and only came out tied"), and the family babysitter Holly Jones.

When confronted by state officials and treated poorly Pop Kwimper decides that the family will settle on the side of the highway permanently. Pop learns of old homesteading statutes in the state and determines that he has a legal right to occupy the land.

The novel revolves around the family's comical battles with the government, as they establish their lives on the untitled land and are eventually joined by other pioneers. The family also contends with meddling social workers, their own poverty, starting up small businesses, a hurricane, and a group of gangsters that tries to squat on nearby land to run an illegal casino.

Of the novel's satire, in the first edition of the novel the publisher writes:

"It's possible that some readers may see woven into this comedy the theme of Little Man versus Big Government. They may also find it a study of the classic pioneering spirit and of its chances of survival in America today."

== Inspiration ==
The novel is based on a true story. After World War II, Powell moved to Fort Myers, Florida. Powell learned that the state of Florida had just built a bridge to Pine Island. The fill used to build the bridge inadvertently created a tract of land that did not exist on maps but now is known as Matlacha. A group of squatters moved onto the land, building shacks and starting small businesses, as in the novel. Eventually, the state granted property titles to the squatters.

Powell's previous novel was The Philadelphian, a serious novel about four-generations of a Philadelphia family as they navigate the city's complex social ladder. The book spent 6 months on the best-seller charts. Most observers expected Powell to follow up with a similar book, but instead he wanted something different and wrote a comedy.

== Adaptation ==
In 1962, the book was adapted into a movie starring Elvis Presley. Although the name Pioneer, Go Home! was considered for the film, it was ultimately named Follow that Dream. The film features five songs sung by Presley and a score by Hans J. Salter. Elvis played the role of Toby Kwimper. Arthur O'Connell played Pop Kwimper. The screenplay was written by Charles Lederer, who also wrote the original Ocean's Eleven and the Marlon Brando version of Mutiny on the Bounty.
