= Follow That Dream =

1962 film by Gordon Douglas

- Theatrical release poster
- Directed by: Gordon Douglas
- Screenplay by: Charles Lederer
- Based on: Pioneer, Go Home! by Richard P. Powell
- Produced by: David Weisbart
- Starring: Elvis Presley; Arthur O'Connell; Anne Helm; Joanna Moore; Jack Kruschen
- Cinematography: Leo Tover
- Edited by: William B. Murphy
- Music by: Hans J. Salter
- Production company: Mirisch Company
- Distributed by: United Artists
- Release date: April 11, 1962 (USA)
- Running time: 110 minutes
- Country: United States
- Language: English
- Box office: $2.8 million (US/Canada)

Follow That Dream is a 1962 American musical comedy film made by Mirisch Productions and starring Elvis Presley. The film was based on the 1959 novel Pioneer, Go Home! by Richard P. Powell. Producer Walter Mirisch liked the film's song "Follow That Dream" and retitled the picture accordingly. The film reached #5 on the Variety weekly Box Office Survey, staying on the chart for three weeks, and finishing at #33 on the year-end list of the top-grossing movies of 1962.

== Plot ==
A vagabond family composed of Pop Kwimper, his good-natured but unsophisticated son Toby, and various informally "adopted" children, including their babysitter, a 19-year-old named Holly Jones, is traveling through Florida. Pop drives onto an unopened section of a new highway. The car runs out of gas and the Kwimpers intend to wait until a government vehicle passes by to help them out. In the meantime, they set up a temporary camp.

After a time, the first vehicle to come by belongs to state highway commissioner H. Arthur King, who is appalled that the Kwimpers' presence on the pristine highway might negatively impact its dedication ceremony that day featuring the governor of Florida. King tries to have the Kwimpers forcibly removed, but when the governor arrives in advance of the ceremony, Pop informs him that they are invoking the state's homesteading laws and plan to live near the highway permanently. The governor applauds the Kwimpers' pioneering spirit and tells the police to respect "private property."

King, who considers the Kwimpers to be a huge nuisance, leaves angrily and vows to return. Holly tells Toby that she is thrilled by the prospect of homesteading because she has never had a real permanent home. A chance encounter with an avid fisherman gives Holly an idea: with the help of a $2,000 bank loan, they will build a thriving business catering to sport fishermen.

Trouble soon follows. King has the Kwimpers cut off from all social assistance from their home state. As the area is technically outside the jurisdiction of any law enforcement, two gamblers soon set up a raucous casino in a trailer. They attempt to buy the Kwimpers' land and belongings, but Pop refuses to sell at any price.

Shortly thereafter, Toby rejects the advances of an amorous social worker named Alicia Claypoole, an ally of King. In an act of revenge, she begins legal action to have the children taken away from Pop and make them wards of the state.

Toby becomes the new community's sheriff and tries to quell the noise coming from the casino every night. His presence as a law-enforcement officer causes the casino patrons to flee. The gamblers bring in a team of hit men from Detroit to eliminate Toby and build a bomb to destroy the Kwimpers' home. However, Toby naively but successfully deals with the casino's armed thugs, and after Holly innocently returns a bag (containing the bomb) left under their front porch by their neighbors, the casino trailer blows up. The gamblers cut their losses and flee, convinced they are lucky to be leaving with their lives.

In the end, Toby's earthy wits and honesty win over the judge at the children's custody hearing. The judge orders the children to be returned to Pop and also praises the Kwimpers' pioneer spirit in his statement to the court. The family happily returns to its new land and home. Holly also gets Toby to recognize that she is now a grown woman, and it is implied they will soon marry.

== Cast ==
- Elvis Presley as Toby
- Anne Helm as Holly
- Arthur O'Connell as Pop
- Joanna Moore as Alisa
- Jack Kruschen as Carmine
- Simon Oakland as Nick
- Roland Winters as Judge
- Alan Hewitt as H. Arthur King
- Howard McNear as George
- Frank DeKova as Jack
- Herbert Rudley as Endicott
- Gavin Koon as Eddy
- Robin Koon as Teddy
- Barry Russo as Al

== Production ==
With a working title from the novel of Pioneer, Go Home! by Richard P. Powell, the title Follow That Dream was chosen because the songwriters allegedly could not find a rhyme for "pioneer". At first, Powell was unhappy that Presley had been chosen for the role, but after seeing the finished film, he thought Presley had performed well.

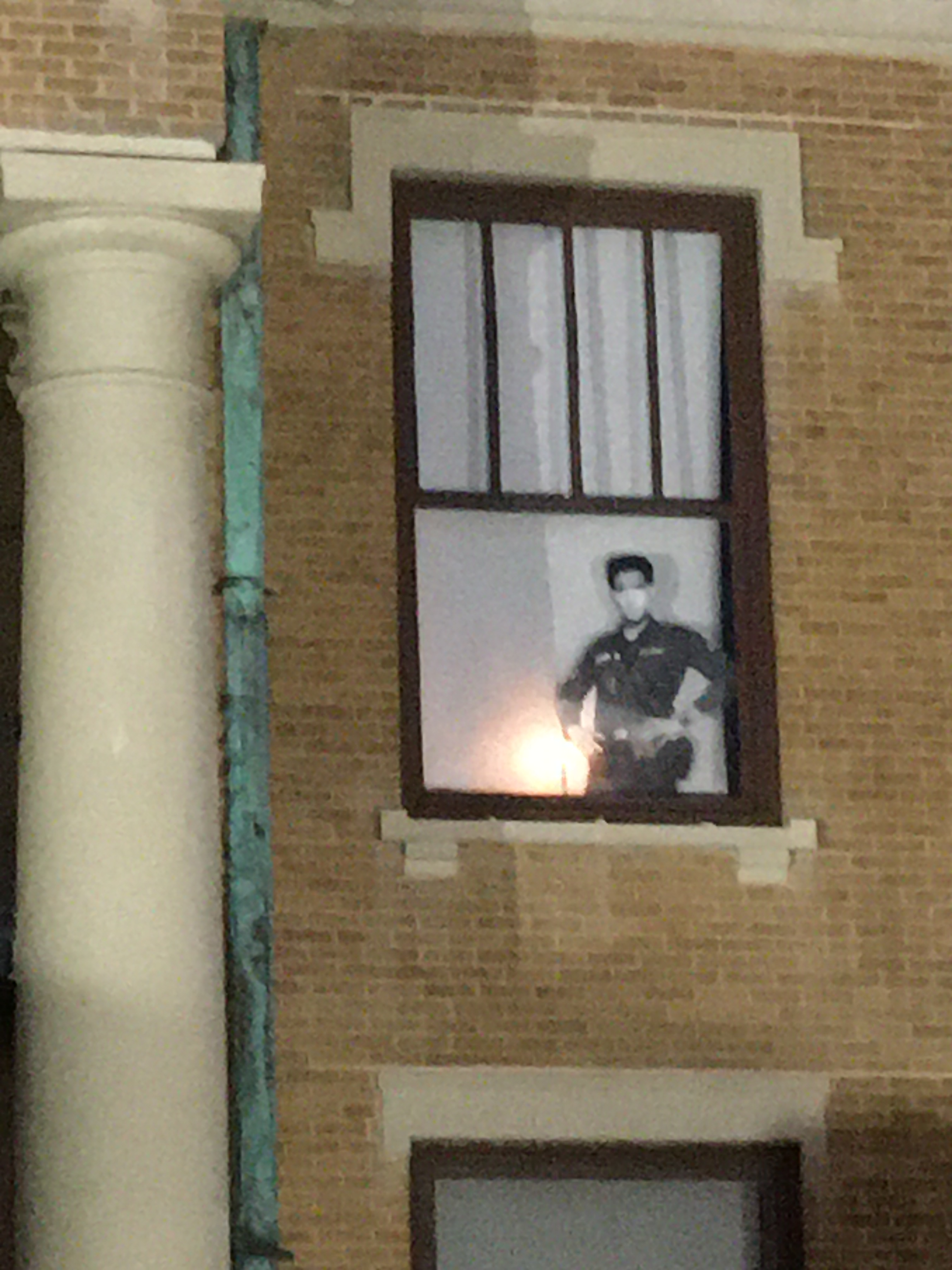
A cardboard cutout of Presley at the window of the Old Citrus County Courthouse in Inverness, Florida

Filming began on July 11, 1961 in northwestern-central Florida. It was filmed in the counties of Citrus, Marion and Levy, specifically Inverness, Ocala, Inglis and Yankeetown. The courtroom scene took place in the 1912 Citrus County Old Courthouse in Inverness, which has been restored and is now listed in the National Register of Historic Places. Part of the courtroom restoration can be directly attributed to the film in that it was the only record of the original courtroom configuration. Yankeetown memorializes Presley's stay in the form of a major highway, Follow That Dream Parkway, which opened on July 27, 1996 with a dedication and celebration held in Inglis. The parkway was so named because of the efforts of four of Presley's fans. The location of the Kwimper compound is at the southwestern point of Pumpkin Island at the bridge. The bank scene was filmed in Ocala at a bank on Silver Springs Boulevard. "Elvis was a damned good actor and played some damned good scenes," said Gordon Douglas. "He could do more than sing."

During filming, Presley met a 10-year-old Tom Petty, whose uncle was involved in the film's production. Shortly afterward, Petty swapped his slingshot for a friend's collection of Presley records.

Director Gordon Douglas "always wondered" why the film was called Follow that Dream: "It sounded like a Doris Day picture."

== Reception ==
Critical reviews were mixed. Bosley Crowther of The New York Times wrote, "Judging by this laboriously homespun and simple-minded exercise about just plain folks, somebody must have decided that the Presley films have been getting a little too glossy lately. In any case, compared to yesterday's serving of corn-meal mush (from United Artists), 'Blue Hawaii' was caviar." A review in Variety stated that "by Presley pix standards, it's above average ... Presley conveys the right blend of horse sense and naivete in his characterization, and delivers five songs with vocal competence and nary a wiggle." Harrison's Reports graded the film as "Good," lauding it as "a smoothly-paced, warmth-giving attempt at story-telling, which may even rub off on the adults thus giving the box office take a nice boost." Richard L. Coe of The Washington Post called the film "absurd nonsense," adding, "Presley's guitar is along for several ballads, delivered with reasonable restraint. I don't object to him as a performer, in fact he does reasonably well by a character that seems to be a cross between Li'l Abner and Tammy. What is objectionable is the tasteless corn and frankly political pitch." The Monthly Film Bulletin dismissed the picture as "a rag-bag of film conventions, handsomely photographed by Leo Tover, but barely memorable."

== See also ==
- List of American films of 1962
