= Abel Assessment =

Sex offender assessment tool

The Abel Assessment for Sexual Interest (also Abel Assessment for Interest in Paraphilias) is an assessment test that purports to measure sexual interest in various subjects – and especially to measure a tendency toward pedophilia. The test was created by Dr. Gene G. Abel in 1995, and has been subsequently revised several times. It has been used as evidence in Northern America when prosecuting sex offenders, although its reliability has since been disputed and it has been declared inadmissible in court in various jurisdictions.

The Abel Assessment is controversial because its results, although subjective, are presented as cut and dried. Some experts question its methodology.

Despite the test's uncertainty, mental health professionals have used the Abel Assessment to civilly commit sex offenders.

== History and testing method ==
Dr. Gene Abel began researching sexual interest in the early 1990s. It was reported that he previously used the penile plethysmograph before developing the Abel Assessment.

In the Abel Assessment, the subject is shown a series of slides in two separate processes. The first measures each slide's viewing time, determining the subject's reaction vis-à-vis the mean reaction. If the subject's viewing time is longer than the mean, it is said that he has a sexual interest in the image shown. For example, if the subject looks at children in bathing suits for longer than average, the Abel Assessment shows him as having an interest in children.

During the second process, the individual must rate the images from 1 to 7, with 1 being revolting and 7 being sexually exciting.

== Questions of validity ==
The validity of the Abel Assessment has been questioned; it has struggled at times to pass the Daubert standard for admissibility in federal and state courts.

In 2002, the Abel Assessment was found to be inadmissible in court cases in Massachusetts, a ruling that was upheld by the Massachusetts Court of Appeals in 2005.

The validity of the test's methodology has been criticized. Abel is said to have exaggerated various statistics in order to prove his point. In the early 90s, he announced that he had figures suggesting sex offenders commonly have multiple paraphilias. However, Marshall and Eccles found in 1991 that he had not mentioned that he had concentrated on any offender reporting multiple deviant acts as more than one person. This greatly increased his findings.

Abel made this assertion from the results of the report "The Abel and Harlow Child Molestation Prevention Study". The report was never subject to peer review or published in any professional journal. There is also no in-depth detail about his methodology available. The Abel Assessment is based on these findings.

In a 2002 decision on the admissibility of the test by Texas appellate judge Brian Quinn, the court said that since Abel's proprietary scoring methodology is not publicly known, it "could be mathematically based, founded upon indisputable empirical research, or simply the magic of young Harry Potter's mixing potions at the Hogwarts School of Witchcraft and Wizardry".

Abel states in his book that a therapist can use the test as a tool to determine if a child is attracted to other children. The 9th Circuit Court of Appeals also ruled in 2004 that the Abel Assessment is a tool that is used only as treatment, and that it cannot detect whether a person has sexually abused children. Independent studies of the Abel Assessment have concluded it to be unreliable in adults and that there is not yet enough information to support its use with adolescents.

The Diana Screen is another test developed by Abel and his associates. It, too, has been a source of controversy for Abel due to it being a pass/fail test.
