= Gene Abel =

American psychiatrist

Gene Gordon Abel
- Occupation: Psychiatrist
- Known for: Abel Assessment for Sexual Interest; Diana Screening

Gene Gordon Abel is an American psychiatrist and controversial clinician. He is a couple's counselor and also works with men and boys suspected of sexual deviancy. He is the creator of the Abel Assessment for Sexual Interest (AASI), a sex offender assessment tool that has been considered unreliable by independent studies and inadmissible in court in various jurisdictions. He also designed a screening test called the Diana Screen, to be used, e.g., to screen job applicants for deviant sexual tendencies – a test which has been similarly criticized as having dubious scientific value.

== Career ==
Abel was previously a professor of medicine at the Columbia University School of Medicine, and currently teaches at the Morehouse School of Medicine and the Emory University School of Medicine. He is the medical director of the Behavioral Medicine Institute of Atlanta.

== Awards and recognitions ==
Abel is a fellow of the American Psychiatric Association and the Academy of Behavioral Medicine Research and a past president of the Society of Behavioral Medicine (1981–82). He was the recipient of a 1990 Masters and Johnson Award of the Society for Sex Therapy and Research, a 1991 Significant Achievement Award of the Association for the Treatment of Sexual Abusers, and a 2013 Distinguished Alumni Award of the University of Iowa Carver College of Medicine.

== Lack of known scientific basis for assessment test methodology ==
Abel has been criticized for having no clear, well-accepted scientific basis for his assessment process. Abel wrote a report called "The Abel and Harlow Child Molestation Prevention Study" in a chapter of a 2001 self-published book he wrote called The Stop Child Molestation Book (coauthored with Nora Harlow, using the self-publication service Xlibris), and the Abel Assessment test is based on findings of a study associated with that report. However, the report was never subject to peer review and was not published in any professional journal, and it provides no detailed description of his testing methodology for scientific study and independent verification.

Abel is also said to have exaggerated various statistics in order to support his conclusions and methodology. For example, in the early 1990s he announced that he had figures suggesting that sex offenders commonly have multiple paraphilias. However, a 1991 journal publication refuted this claim in a report criticizing Abel's methods for double counting, and thus skewing the study's statistical weight.

Mental health professionals have used the AASI to civilly commit sex offenders, even though the Assessment is not admissible in many courts in the United States. In 2002, the Assessment was found to be inadmissible in court cases in the Commonwealth of Massachusetts, a ruling that was upheld by the Massachusetts Court of Appeals in 2005. In a 2002 decision on the admissibility of the test by Texas appellate judge Brian Quinn, the court said that since Abel's proprietary scoring methodology is not publicly known, it "could be mathematically based, founded upon indisputable empirical research, or simply the magic of young Harry Potter's mixing potions at the Hogwarts School of Witchcraft and Wizardry". The 9th Circuit Court of Appeals also ruled in 2004 that the Assessment is a tool that should be used only as treatment, and that it cannot detect whether a person has sexually abused children. Independent studies of the Assessment have concluded it to be unreliable in adults and that there is not yet enough information to support its use with adolescents, whereas Abel states in his book that a therapist can not only use the Assessment for assessing adults, but also as a tool to determine whether a child is attracted to other children.

The Diana Screen has also been a source of controversy for Abel due to it being a pass/fail assessment. The assessment purports to determine if someone has molested a child. Abel has promoted the use of the Diana Screen as a business opportunity for individuals and agencies. A study by Abel found that more than 60% of American child molesters identified as Protestant.
