= Gene Solia-Gibb =

- Born: 16 October 1983 (age 43); New Zealand
- Occupations: Netball player, rugby player, fibre-optic cable installer
- Known for: Representing Samoa in netball and rugby
- Notable work: Competed in the 2006 Commonwealth Games, 2007 World Netball Championships, and 2019 Netball World Cup

Gerardine Nafanua Solia-Gibb (born 16 October 1983) is a Samoan New Zealander netball and rugby player who has represented Samoa internationally in both sports, including at the Commonwealth Games. She is the sister of netball player Frances Solia.

Solia-Gibb is from Wainuiomata and was educated at St Mary's College, Wellington. She works as a fibre-optic cable installer. She played netball for the Capital Shakers and Central Pulse. She was selected for the Samoa national netball team for the 2006 Commonwealth Games, and the 2007 World Netball Championships. She was co-captain alongside Brooke Amber Williams for the 2019 Netball World Cup.

In 2016 she was selected for the Samoa women's national rugby sevens team to play against New Zealand and the Cook Islands. In November 2020 she was selected for the Samoa women's national rugby union team for the 2021 Rugby World Cup qualifying repecharge match against Tonga.
