= Richard P. Powell =

American writer

Richard Pitts Powell (November 28, 1908 – December 8, 1999), professionally known as Richard P. Powell, was an American novelist.

== Biography ==
Born in Philadelphia, Pennsylvania, Powell graduated from Princeton University in 1930, then worked at the Philadelphia Evening Public Ledger newspaper. After ten years, he joined the advertising agency N. W. Ayer & Son. Following service on Gen. Douglas MacArthur's staff during World War II, he returned to N. W. Ayer, where he rose to vice president of information services in 1952.

In the 1940s, Powell began writing fiction,and his first published books were Inner Sanctum Mysteries, published from 1943 to 1955. By the mid-1950s, he was able to devote himself to writing full time. The Philadelphian (1956), his major publishing debut, spent more than six months on the bestseller list and was filmed in 1959 as The Young Philadelphians, starring Paul Newman. Two of his other novels (one written under a pseudonym) also were adapted into films.

Richard Powell died on December 8, 1999, in Fort Myers, Florida.

== Novels ==
- Don’t Catch Me (1943)
- All Over but the Shooting (1944)
- Lay that Pistol Down (1945)
- Shoot if You Must (1946)
- And Hope to Die (1947)
- Shark River (1949)
- Shell Game (1950)
- The Build-Up Boys (1951) (written as Jeremy Kirk)
- A Shot in the Dark (1952), republished with Shell Game in 2008, ISBN 1-933586-18-4
- Say It with Bullets (1953), republished in 2006, Dorchester Publishing Hard Case Crime, ISBN 0-8439-5589-9
- False Colors (1955)
- The Philadelphian (1956), republished in 2006, Plexus Publishing, ISBN 0-937548-62-6
- Pioneer, Go Home! (1959), ISBN 0-89176-008-3. Filmed in 1962 as Follow That Dream starring Elvis Presley.
- The Soldier (1960)
- I Take this Land (1963)
- Daily and Sunday (1964)
- Don Quixote, U.S.A. (1966)
- Tickets to the Devil (1968), ISBN 0-910791-41-4
- Whom the Gods Would Destroy (1970)

Dorchester Publishing republished Say It with Bullets in paperback in March 2006 as part of its Hard Case Crime series. Plexus Publishing republished The Philadelphian in hardcover and paperback in November 2006. The new edition features a foreword by Robert Vaughn and additional material from Powell and his daughter. Shell Game and A Shot in the Dark were republished by Starkhouse Press in 2008.

== In film ==
- The Philadelphian was made into the movie The Young Philadelphians (1959), starring Paul Newman, Barbara Rush and Robert Vaughn, who received an Academy Award nomination for his role.
- The Build-Up Boys (written under the pen name of Jeremy Kirk) was made into a 1961 film renamed Madison Avenue.
- Pioneer, Go Home! was made into a 1962 film renamed Follow That Dream, starring Elvis Presley.
- The 1971 Woody Allen movie Bananas also uses elements of Don Quixote, U.S.A. in its plot.
