= Gene Quaw =

American musician (1891–1968)

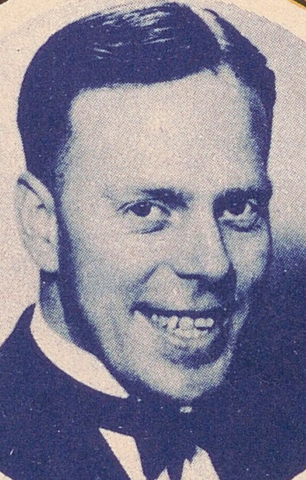
- Born: Eugene Cole Quaw; March 6, 1891; Belgrade, Montana, US
- Died: December 17, 1968 (aged 77); Bozeman, Montana, US
- Education: Montana State College, University of Minnesota, the University of California, the University of Arizona, and Louisiana State University
- Known for: Yellowstone (song), Old Man Jazz

Eugene Cole "Gene" Quaw (March 6, 1891 – December 17, 1968) was a Montana musician notable for his outdoor performances at the Canyon Hotel of Yellowstone National Park. At this venue, he would play one of his more well-known pieces, Yellowstone.

== Early life ==
Originally living in Belgrade, Montana, Quaw moved to Bozeman and continued to live there from 1896 during his childhood, through his completion of an undergraduate degree at Montana State University (then Montana State College). His first experiences with music were with Louis Leo Howard, a music director who supervised Quaw and his piano playing at the Bozeman Opera House. After graduation, Quaw composed music as a band leader and continued his studies across multiple universities, namely University of Minnesota, the University of California, the University of Arizona, and Louisiana State University.

== Career ==
Gene Quaw published numerous songs, including Under Any Old Moon at All (1909), Twilight Time (1920), Old Man Jazz (1920), Nobody Else (1923), The Rose of Sigma Chi (1924), Yellowstone (1937), Song of the Engineers (1942), and Dream Girl of Sigma Chi (1948).

Throughout the 1920s and 1930s, his band, the Gene Quaw Orchestra performed outdoors for guests at Yellowstone National Park's Grand Canyon Hotel. Their performances involved a dance orchestra, and, one summer, performing with the "Canyon Hotel Follies". In 1937, Quaw composed Yellowstone as the theme song for the national park. The band often played a mix of classical standards but always ended their performances with Yellowstone.

In 1951, Quaw held a concert in Bozeman, Montana where he was presented a photo album as a tribute to his work; this album was created and signed by Montana residents and historical figures, including Fred F. Wilson, Jack Ellis Haynes, and Louis Leo Howard.
