= Gene Ritchie Monahan =

American portrait and landscape artist

Monahan in her studio, 1985

Gene Ritchie Monahan (1908 – February 12, 1994) was an American portrait and landscape artist. She is best remembered for the character and mood she conveyed in her portraits and for the realism in her pen-and-ink drawings for the Rainy Lake Chronicle, a weekly Minnesota newspaper with an international readership.

== Early life ==
Genevieve (Gene) Ritchie was the daughter of an electrician. She graduated from Denfeld High School in Duluth, Minnesota, in 1927. She hoped to attend the School of the Art Institute of Chicago. Although she was able to pass the entrance exam, the cost was too expensive. Instead she signed up for art lessons with local painters David Ericson and A. E. Schar.

One of Ritchie's earliest works was a self-portrait that earned her first place in the Duluth Art Institute's annual Arrowhead Art Exhibition. The painting garnered attention from national art critics, leading the portrait to be featured on the cover of Art Digest. The magazine described her as "the find of the year" in 1930.

Ritchie earned a teaching certificate at Duluth State Teachers College and then transferred to the University of Minnesota. She taught art at the Phyllis Wheatley Settlement House. She also gave private lessons and opened a painting studio to sell her portraits and teach classes. University student George Monahan was an early customer and married her a year and a half after she finished his portrait.

Monahan's husband joined the Army just before World War II. This prompted her to enroll in the University of Minnesota's graduate program in art education, partly in case something happened to him. She supported her children during the war by working as supervisor of art for Faribault Public Schools. She had three children.

== Art career ==
In 1955, Monahan's family moved to New York City, where she opened the Studio Gallery in Greenwich Village. She received a scholarship to study and teach at the National Academy School of Fine Arts. Although pressured by other Village artists to work in the abstract style, she refused. Her paintings were praised by Village Voice art critics for their light-filled natural tones and confident brushwork.

Friends and family drew the couple back to Minnesota in 1960. They bought a home in Ranier, Minnesota, in 1963 and spent time on the Rainy Lake islands of conservationist Ernest Oberholtzer. Monahan continued her work as part of a colony of local artists. She expanded her portfolio to include silk screening and bookbinding, and experimented with sculpture and pottery using local clays.

In the early 1970s, Time magazine's bureau chief, Ted Hall, left New York City and moved to Ranier to establish the Rainy Lake Chronicle. He called on Monahan to illustrate stories and create cover art. Monahan's drawings and paintings came to represent the people, places, and natural elements of the border lakes region. Author and environmentalist Sigurd Olson said her work "caught the details of the changing seasons, the little things that appear almost without expecting them, the flash of a gull's wing in the early spring, the freezing of the lake, the sounds and rumbles, the thawing in the spring."

Throughout her career, Monahan received national acclaim. In the late 1950s, she was elected president of New York City's branch of the National League of American Pen Women. She won first prize in portrait art at a Smithsonian National Gallery of Art exhibition in 1962. She was invited to present the first one-woman show in the Little Gallery at the Minneapolis Institute of Arts (1964). For two summers in the late 1960s, she was invited to paint and teach art to members of the Sandy Lake First Nation in Ontario.

Among those who sat for Monahan's portraits were pianist Van Cliburn, Canadian First Nations artists Norval Morrisseau and Carl Ray, Minnesota governor Rudy Perpich, conservationists Ernest Oberholtzer and Frances Andrews, and the wife of O. Meredith Wilson. Her work is held in public, corporate, and private collections worldwide.

Monahan died on February 12, 1994, at the age of 85. Her work continues to be exhibited, and was shown in Duluth in 2015, Grand Marais in 2016, and International Falls in 2017.
