= Gene Cohen Boyer =

- Born: Gene Cohen; 1925; Milwaukee, Wisconsin, U.S.
- Died: 2003 (aged 77–78)
- Education: University of Wisconsin–Madison

Gene Cohen Boyer (1925–2003) was an American women's rights activist.

== Early life and education ==
Boyer was born Gene Cohen in Milwaukee, Wisconsin, to an Orthodox Jewish family; her father managed a chain of shoe stores. She graduated high school at age 16 and earned a journalism degree at the University of Wisconsin–Madison (UW–Madison) in 1946.

== Career ==
In 1945, Cohen married Burt Boyer, a baseball player in the military. The couple settled in Beaver Dam in 1949, after the birth of their first daughter. There, the couple opened Boyer's Furniture, which they co-ran for 32 years.

After the local Chamber of Commerce barred her because she was a woman, Boyer channelled her business acumen into activism, first through the Wisconsin Commission on the Status of Women and, in June 1966, as one of the founders of National Organization for Women (NOW). Within NOW, she served on the national board from 1968 to 1970 and as treasurer in 1970, devising its budgeting system and co-launching the NOW Legal Defense and Education Fund in 1970. Back home she chaired Wisconsin NOW, co-drafted bylaws for the Wisconsin Women's Network (1979), and founded both the Wisconsin Business Women’s Coalition and the Jewish Women’s Coalition to link economic equity with feminist goals.

Her advocacy extended to lobbying for the Equal Rights Amendment, marital-property reform, sexual-assault legislation and comprehensive sex education.

== Awards and honours ==
Boyer received several recognitions, including being named National Women-in-Business Advocate of the Year by the Reagan administration in 1985. She also served on the U.S. planning committee for the United Nations Fourth World Conference on Women in 1994–1995 and was named Wisconsin Stateswoman of the Year in 1997.
