= Josephine Angelini =

American writer and novelist

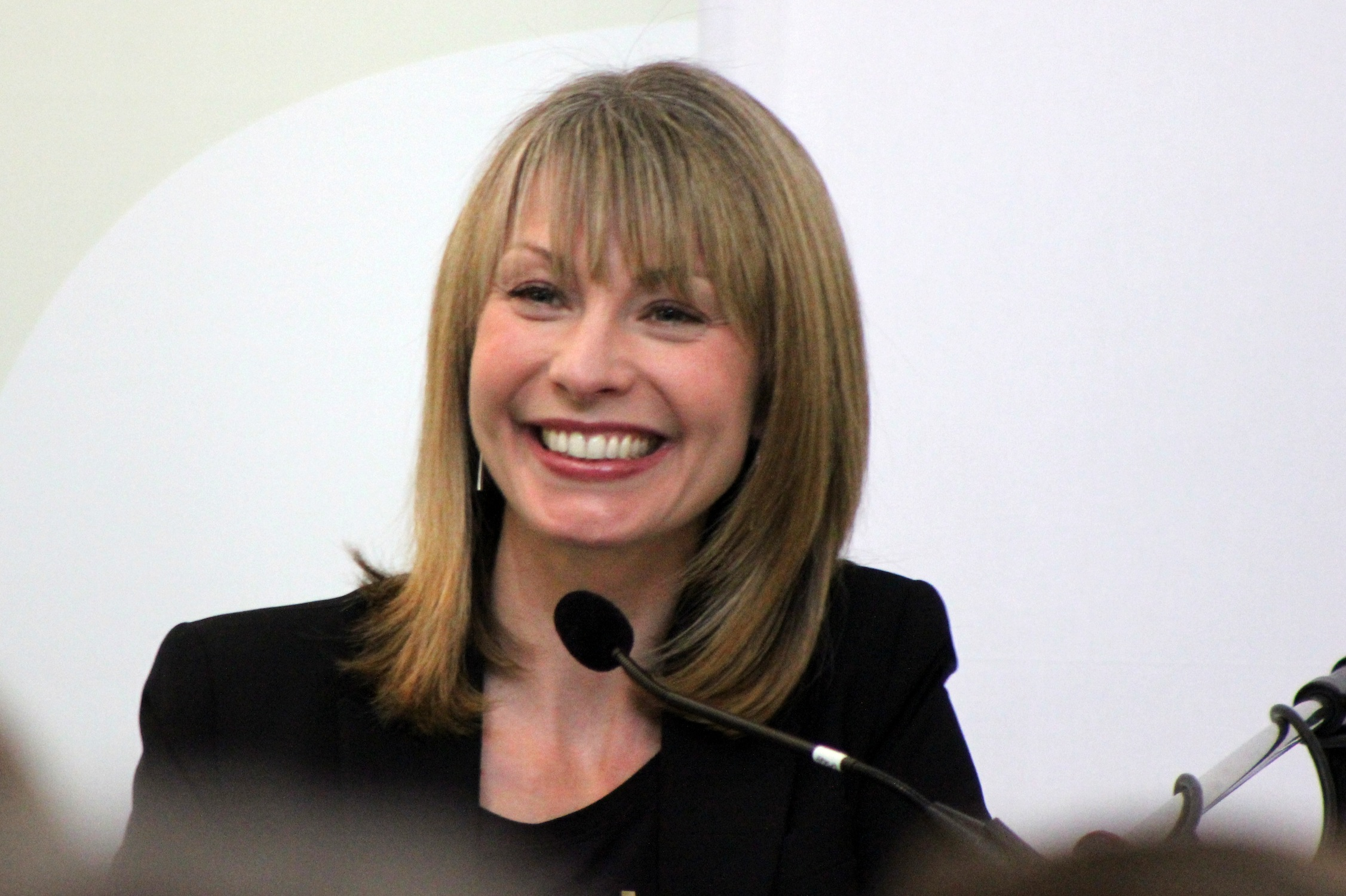
- Josephine Angelini in Leipzig Book Fair (2013)
- Born: 1975 (age 50–51); Ashland, Massachusetts, U.S.
- Other name: Josie
- Education: New York University Tisch School of the Arts
- Occupation: Author
- Years active: 2011–present
- Known for: Young adult fiction novels
- Notable work: Starcrossed Series
- Website: http://www.josephineangelini.com/

Josephine Angelini (born 1975) is an American author who is best known for her young adult novel series Starcrossed.

== Biography ==
Angelini was born and raised in Ashland, Massachusetts. She is the daughter of a farmer and the youngest of eight siblings. She graduated from New York University's Tisch School of the Arts, and then moved to Los Angeles. She lives there with her husband and daughter.

In 2022, Angelini and her husband launched the publisher Sungrazer Publishing.

== Work ==
=== Starcrossed Series ===
- Starcrossed (2011), HarperCollins. ISBN 978-0062012005.
- Dreamless (2012), HarperCollins. ISBN 978-0062012029.
- Goddess (2013), HarperCollins. ISBN 978-0062012043.
- Outcasts (Prequel)
- Timeless (Sequel)
- Scions (Prequel)
- Endless (Sequel)

=== The Worldwalker Series ===
- Trial by Fire (2014), Macmillan Publishers. ISBN 978-1250068194.
- Firewalker (2015), Macmillan Publishers. ISBN 978-1250050908.
- Rowan (2015), Macmillan Publishers. ISBN 978-1250082329.
- Witch's Pyre (2016), Macmillan Publishers. ISBN 978-1250050915.

=== Standalone novels ===
- Snow Lane (2018), Feiwel & Friends. ISBN 978-1250150929.
- What She Found in the Woods (2019), Macmillan Children's Books. ISBN 978-1529017717.
