= Rawlinson Excidium Troie =

Manuscript of Destruction of Troy

The Rawlinson Excidium Troie ("The Destruction of Troy"), discovered among the manuscripts collected by Richard Rawlinson (1690–1755) conserved in the Bodleian Library, Oxford, is unique in that it contains the only medieval account of the Trojan War that is fully independent of Dictys and Dares, "strikingly different from any other known mediaeval version of the Trojan War", according to its editor, E. Bagby Atwood. Its discovery revealed a source for many details in medieval texts whose sources had been obscure, not appearing in the familiar Latin epitomes of the Iliad, through which Homer was transmitted to medieval culture, the Greek text being lost to Western Europe.

That there was a lost Latin source grew clearer in the late nineteenth century, as scholars compared narrative poems like the Middle English The Seege or Batayle of Troy with Konrad von Würzburg's Trojanische Krieg and with versions in Old Norse and in Bulgarian, and found that they shared details in the opening episodes that were not to be found in Dares nor in the famous Roman de Troie of Benoît de Sainte-Maure. The themes included the dream of Hecuba and the birth of Paris, his Judgement of the Goddesses—with varying degrees of independence in this oft-told material—and his carrying off of Helen, and the youth of Achilles. In some of the vernacular poems, traces of Latin declensions in proper names betrayed an unidentified Latin source.

The Rawlinson manuscript formed part of a volume of fragments collected by Peter Le Neve (1661–1729), herald and antiquary, which found their way into Rawlinson's library. It consists of eight and a half folios, written in two columns in a fine late thirteenth-century hand. Two-thirds of the manuscript consists of a condensed epitome of the Aeneid, unusually faithful to the original, but rearranged in chronologically consecutive order. The opening third contains a history of the Trojan War from the marriage of Thetis to the building of the Trojan Horse, set out in a question-and-answer fashion that suggested to Atwood a school text, perhaps prefatory to the study of Virgil.

The narrative material has been drawn together and classically ordered from so many scattered sources that its editor, E. Bagby Atwood, considered that it was "utterly impossible to consider that the account was originated by the mediaeval author of the extant version," and "utterly impossible to suppose a mediaeval writer capable of selecting and arranging this scattered information in a simple, connected narrative agreeing so closely in plan and order with the ancient Epic Cycle." He concluded that it was a recension of a considerably older Latin chronicle of the Trojan War, perhaps as early as the Augustan age.
