= Gene (novel) =

Novel by Stel Pavlou

- Book cover
- Author: Stel Pavlou
- Publisher: Simon & Schuster
- Publication date: 2005

Gene is a 2005 thriller novel by Stel Pavlou, published by Simon & Schuster. The novel is about a fictional New York detective, James North, who in the process of hunting down a criminal, uncovers a genetics experiment to unlock past lives through genetic memory, therefore achieving a kind of immortality. In so doing North discovers his own origins, that of a soldier from the Trojan War who is reincarnated seven times through history, forced to confront his nemesis each time, all for the loss of his one true love.

== Plot summary ==
In dealing with genetic memory, Pavlou has drawn on both the nature of lineage, and the nature of self. Several characters all stem from the same source, and so as their memories become unlocked during the course of the novel, they each identify with being the same person at a distant point in history. The question of identity then becomes fundamental to the plot. If each character shares the same memories are they a reincarnation of that original person, or merely an echo?

The novel is further complicated in that it is told backwards, using a Police procedural as the structure of the novel, memories are unlocked in the form of flashbacks, each flashback delving further and further back in time over the course of 3000 years.

Told in alternating first person and third person, the novel is divided into a prologue and seven "books", the seven trials of Cyclades.

The opening page begins with the first 27 lines of the Human Genome. Thereafter the prologue lays out the death of Cyclades during the Trojan War, and makes it clear that his death is merely the beginning of the journey. Told in first person, Cyclades, a Greek warrior, is mortally wounded. A Sybil forces him to have sex to continue his line, whereupon he dies for the first time in the book.

Book One, shifts to third person and jumps to the year 2004. In New York City Detective James North has been called to the Metropolitan Museum of Art to deal with a mentally unstable man who has run amok amid the exhibits.

== Critical reception ==
Gene has been listed in the Daily Mirror's Top 10 books to look out for in 2005.
