= Starcrossed (novel) =

2011 fantasy paranormal romance novel by American author Josephine Angelini

- Author: Josephine Angelini
- Country: United States
- Language: English
- Genre: Fantasy, Romance
- Publisher: HarperCollins
- Published: April 5, 2011 (Spain)
- Published in English: May 31, 2011
- Media type: Print (hardcover); E-book
- Preceded by: Outcasts Scions
- Followed by: Dreamless Goddess Timeless Endless

Starcrossed is a fantasy paranormal romance novel by American author Josephine Angelini. The story follows a girl named Helen Hamilton, who is gradually revealed to be a modern-day Helen of Troy. After discovering her heritage, Helen learns that a union with the boy she loves may trigger a new Trojan War. The novel was followed by the sequels Dreamless and Goddess, and received praise from critics and fantasy authors amidst its release.

Although originally intended to be a trilogy, Angelini later published further novels in the series. She wrote prequels Outcasts and Scions and then concluded the series with Timeless and Endless which were direct continuations following on after the events of Goddess.

== Overview ==
Starcrossed follows Helen Hamilton, who lives in Nantucket. After having a series of mysterious dreams, along with hallucinations of three girls weeping tears of blood, Helen finds herself romantically drawn to a boy named Lucas. It is eventually revealed that Helen is a modern-day Helen of Troy, and that the women she sees are actually the Furies. She discovers that many of the people she has met recently are actually Archetypes of Greek characters from the Trojan War that are reborn and reincarnated over and over again for unknown reasons. It is also discovered that a union between Lucas and Helen may initiate a new Trojan War. Amidst these revelations, Helen and Lucas seek a way to pursue their blossoming romance without endangering those around them.

== Publication ==
The book was acquired by HarperCollins in early 2010, with foreign deals following at the Bologna Children's Book Fair. The novel was eventually given release dates of April 5, 2011 in Spain, May 15, 2011, in Germany, and May 31, 2011, in the United States. Prior to the novel's release, Angelini revealed that the first sequel of a planned trilogy would be entitled Dreamless.

== Main characters ==
Helen "Lennie" Hamilton—The main protagonist of the novel. Helen is oblivious to her family ancestry due to being abandoned by her mother as a younger child. She lives with her single father on the island of Nantucket which is east of Massachusetts in the Atlantic. Her life was rather peaceful and normal until the Delos family came to town. She has always had a crippling fear of attention and suffers from severe cramp-like symptoms any time she is the recipient of it. It is later revealed to have been caused by a curse her mom placed on her to protect her. Her known abilities include superhuman strength and speed, lightning control-and-manipulation, flying through the air, transforming her physical appearance via shape shifting, and world building (which gives her the ability to descend into the underworld and make her own world). She gains other abilities in the last novel that are central to the plot and conclusion of the story, such as being an Earthshaker a Shadowmaster and a Falsefinder. By the end of the novel she is Lucas's girlfriend.

Lucas Delos—The main romantic love interest, boyfriend, and dearly beloved of Helen, Lucas moves to town after his family disagrees with the practices of their extended relatives. He is the older brother of Cassandra and lives with his parents (Castor and Noel), his aunt (Pandora), his uncle (Pallas) and his three cousins (Hector, Jason and Ariadne). The known abilities he possesses are a hypnotically beautiful, melodious and angelic singing voice, physical fitness and features, superhuman strength, lie detection, superhuman speed, flying, shadow master and lightbending.

Orion Evander- The secondary love interest and friend of Helen and then the boyfriend of Cassandra the oracle and Lucas's sister. He is introduced in the second novel when he is the only other living being that Helen meets in Hell. He has a very traumatic and lonely past, due to his families split allegiances. He is an only child and lives away from his parents and attends a boarding school away from the other characters. His known abilities are being able to sway the hearts of others, sense emotions, open one way portals, super strength and speed, cause earthquakes and being able to breathe underwater.

Hector Delos—The older cousin of Lucas and Cassandra and the older brother of Jason and Ariadne. Hector is the main reason the family moved, as he came close to killing a cousin he disagreed with. Known abilities include superhuman strength, superhuman speed, breathing underwater, water-based combative fighting and hugs really well.

Ariadne Delos—The younger sister of Hector and twin sister of Jason. Known powers include super strength, speed and the ability to heal others.

Jason Delos—The younger brother of Hector and twin brother of Ariadne. Known magical abilities include super strength, speed, the ability to heal others and breathing underwater.

Cassandra "Cassie" Delos—Cassandra is Lucas' younger sister and a prophet of Apollo. She is the Oracle and the fates speak through her. Known powers include foresight.

Creon Delos—The main antagonist of the first novel. Heir to his household and cousin to the Delos children. Known powers are super strength, healing and speed and shadow-bending.

Claire Aoki— Claire is Helens charismatic, vivacious Japanese friend who is often at Helen's side throughout the trilogy. She is a human and has no Scion powers, yet knew something of Helens powers before Helen herself did, due to events when they were children. She was also present for an event in Helens youth when a man - presumed to be a pedophile - made several advances at Helen. To which she unknowingly used her lightning as a defence, although Claire nor Helen remember the lightning, they both do vividly recall the smell of burning. Claire is very intelligent - with an almost extensive knowledge of Greek mythology and history - and hopes to be top of her class and go to Harvard University. She is immediately concerned when the Delos family arrives and she sees how intelligent the boys - particularly Lucas - are and the competition she now has for the top of the class title. Throughout the later novels she develops a relationship with Jason and becomes active in the fight against the Gods.

Titans are the gods parents

== Minor characters ==
Matt Millis—A mortal childhood friend of Helen and Claire. He is sweet and Helen sees him as a brother-figure, even though it seems he would like to be more. Revealed to be a Greek archetype in the last novel.

Jerry Hamilton—Helen's father. He owns a convenience store where Helen occasionally works. In the first novel he is oblivious to his daughters abilities.

Kate—A baker who co-owns the convenience store with Jerry. She is Jerry's love-interest and a mother-figure to Helen.

Noel Delos—Cassandra and Lucas' mortal mother who takes care of the entire Delos family.

Castor Delos—Cassandra and Lucas' Scion father.

Pallas Delos— Castor's brother and Hector, Jason and Ariadne's father. He spends most of the first book keeping watch over the extended family across the sea. He bears contempt towards Helen because she looks like Daphne Atreus, the woman who presumably killed his brother, Ajax.

== Release ==
=== Publicity ===
Publishers Weekly reported on the Starcrossed series in March 2010, announcing that HarperCollins had made a "major pre-Bologna [Book Fair] acquisition". Coverage from Entertainment Weekly followed. In early 2011, Angelini announced that Demi Goddesses, a German musical group, would produce an English-language song inspired by the novel called "Where Do I Belong?", as well as an accompanying music video. Advance reader copies of Starcrossed were released for review by Book It Forward Tours.

=== Reception ===
An early review from Booklist stated, "The riveting plot twists and turns as the myth’s destiny translates into present-day terrors, dreams, and hopelessness, and its execution is seamless." While discussing Helen, Sonja Bolle of the Los Angeles Times stated, "Hers is a road I'm eager to travel; the second book in this series, Dreamless, is slated for May 2012—not soon enough, as far as I'm concerned." Kara Warner of MTV.com called the story "an empowering tale full of intrigue, mythology and self discovery". Kirkus Reviews writes, "A refreshingly strong heroine carries readers into the setup for book two."

== Film adaptation ==
In 2010, Publishers Weekly reported that a possible film adaptation of Starcrossed was being handled by Rachel Miller of Tom Sawyer Entertainment.

== Later installments ==
=== Dreamless ===
Dreamless is a young adult fantasy romance novel by American author Josephine Angelini. Dreamless is the sequel to Starcrossed, is the second installment in a planned trilogy. The story picks up shortly after the events of the first book. Helen Hamilton, heartbroken and forbidden from being with Lucas must venture to the Underworld during her dreams in order to break the curse that keeps them apart. According to WorldCat, the book is held in 638 libraries as of July 2014.

=== Goddess ===
Goddess is the third book in the Starcrossed series by Josephine Angelini. The last installment of the trilogy, released on May 28, 2013. Follow Helen, Lucas and Orion as the face off against the newly released Greek gods and goddesses as they fight for control and attempt to stop the chaos that surrounds them as the world is thrown into unbalance.

=== Outcasts & Scions ===
Prequels to the Starcrossed series featuring a number of known characters in their youth.

=== Timeless & Endless ===
Direct continuations of the original trilogy concluding Helen and Lucas’s story.
