= Whom the Gods Would Destroy =

Novel by Richard P. Powell

First edition

Whom the Gods Would Destroy is a historical novel written by Richard P. Powell and published in 1970 by Charles Scribner's Sons. The title is currently out of print but available as an Amazon Kindle book.

The story is set during the Trojan War and is narrated by a boy named Helios, who claims to be the illegitimate son of Priam.

== Characters ==
The following fictional characters were invented for the novel.

- Helios: The narrator of the novel. He may be an illegitimate son of King Priam.
- Oliana: A Trojan bread baker. Foster mother of Helios.
- Polydextus: The Trojan Master of Stables of the Dardanian Gate. Foster father of Helios.
- Milentius: The Trojan son of the Captain of the Palace Guard.
- Orynia: Helios' birth mother. Born on Rhodes and then became a Trojan slave. She died when Helios was born.
- Sardon: A Hittite from the East who was allowed to stay at Troy because of his knowledge of horses.
- Antimachus: An elderly Trojan counsellor.
- Sisycles: Head scribe of the Trojan palace.
- Deira: The great-granddaughter of Theseus and Ariadne. She is a Cretan princess, an heiress of northern Skyros, and a priestess of Rhea.
- Lycteus: A minor noble of Lyrnessus, a spy of Priam.
- Alcimus: A young Achaean officer.
- Idaeus: The herald of Priam.

The novel also includes these mythological characters from the story of the Trojan War.

- Priam
- Paris
- Cassandra
- Nestor
- Apollo
- Hector
- Troilus
- Helen
- Menelaus
- Andromache
- Aeneas
- Agamemnon
- Antenor
- Gaia
- Laomedon
- Hecuba
- Achilles
- Odysseus
- Diomedes
- Neoptolemus
- Machaon
- Lycomedes
- Calchas
- Rhesus of Thrace
- Automedon
- Briseis
- Polyxena
- Othryoneus
- Thersites

== Plot ==
Chapter 1: The story begins with the narration of Helios at the age of 70. He reflects back to when he was 8 years old and lived in Troy. En route to deliver a pot of cooked meat to his foster father Polydextus, he is confronted by Milentius. Milentius demands the food from Helios and when he refuses, Milentius trips him. The pot of meat shatters and the food is soiled. Helios threatens that his alleged father, King Priam will find out. Milentius threatens to hurt him unless he denies King Priam as his father. Helios retracts his statement just as Prince Paris approaches. Paris mentions how he heard the rumours of Priam having too much wine and meeting a pretty slave girl in a dark corridor and thus leading to the birth of Helios. Paris tells Milentius he did no wrong and says the story sounds absurd due to the age of Priam at the time of conception. Helios returns home and shares the salvaged food with Polydextus. Polydextus then tells Helios how important his heritage is, and he has done a great wrong by denying it when pushed by a bully. He then whips Helios to both punish him and teach him to deal with pain.
Chapter 2: One day Helios climbed a secret stair to the roof of the palace. He decided to offer a sacrifice to the sun, whom his birth mother worshipped. While lying naked on the roof he is surprised by Cassandra, who was the youngest daughter of Priam and several years older than Helios. She says she overheard Paris telling the story of what happened between Helios and Milentius to Priam, and she did not think that Priam cared to hear it too much. After examining Helios she asks him to look into her eyes where he sees a blinding glow. She then insists that the power of the sun will enter him in time. After leaving the roof Helios is attacked by Milentius and another boy. Helios successfully fends them off, swinging a dead branch that fell off the sacred bay tree. He yells that he is in fact a son of Priam. Prince Hector stops Helios from fighting them off, and then shows him to Priam. Priam asked Helios to return home while he considered the matter. Cassandra followed after Helios, giving him the dead branch he swung earlier telling him it is an honor of Apollo to receive a sacred weapon. At home he sacrificed the branch with Polydextus as an offering of thanks to the Gods. Shortly after, Hector arrived to inform Helios and his foster parents that Priam is not displeased. He has not officially acknowledged Helios as his son, but would like him to work at the palace as stable boy.
Chapter 3: After becoming stable boy, Polydextus and Troilus train Helios in chariot fighting and javeling. Polydextus, Troilus, and Sardon would also discuss battle strategies. Helios would ride a horse on an occasion which were not meant to be ridden due to their small stature, and would be whipped by Polydextus as punishment. Nine summers of training later Helios "gained three fingers in height", and his weight "balanced that of a sack of wheat". This was an improvement, but not by much. One morning Hector allowed Helios to accompany him to meet Paris, who was returning from his mission across the sea. Hector & Helios are introduced to Helen of Sparta, who accompanied Paris back to Troy along with her dowry meant for Menelaus. Paris insults Helios, causing him to leap at him in anger. Paris begins to whip Helios, but Polydextus draws a blade and prepares to fight. A woman screams for Hector, who stops the fight and explains to Paris that Priam has not acknowledged or denied Helios' bloodline. Paris accepts the explanation, but Helios says he knows they will never be friends. They all travel to Troy together.
Chapter 4: Soon after the group returned form the beach, Priam called an immediate meeting of the council. Hector & Andromache's bedroom balcony overlooks the throne room. With Hector's permission and guidance, Helios crawled onto the balcony to watch the council meeting from above. Priam enters the throne room and he informs the room that he called the meeting to hear Paris' report from his trip across the Aegean. Paris first lectures the room on his travel, then displays found treasures from his exploits, and then introduces Helen. Antimachus approves of Paris' doings, and cries of approval were heard from the council. Later on Helios learned there was rumors of Antimachus being paid to back this argument. Prince Aeneas is granted permission to speak by Priam, who proposed that allowing Helen to stay may ignite war with Agamemnon, the High King of the Achaeans. Paris insists that it is impossible to have the Achaeans band together, and if that does happen Troy will protect him. Antenor then pushed his way into the open and says allowing Helen to stay would be a violation of customs, disrespectful, and would bring the anger of the Gods. With great respect Helen asks for permission to speak, and tells the story of Gaia, and how she is a woman and has the power to "put away a male". She says she "does things and does not know why", and then asks Priam for "help" understanding the decision she has made to accompany Paris. Priam then announces that it is his will that Helen be welcomed to Troy as the lawful mate of Paris. Suddenly Cassandra cries out from the women's balcony a prediction of Paris bringing death to Troy. Priam ordered her gagged and sent to her room immediately. Helios began to think of her as "his Cassandra" even though they only met once over a year ago. He crawled back into the bedroom and waited for Hector to return. Hector informed Helios that she was whipped by Priam for interrupting council, and after fled to the roof alone. After hearing this, Helios sneaks to the storeroom and fills a jar with salve. He takes off his tunic in order to tie the jar around his neck so that he would be free to climb up a palace wall with both hands. At the top he was greeted by Cassandra, who questions his nudity. She undresses so that Helios could put the salve on her back, bruised from the whipping. She cried and hugged Helios because of his thoughtfulness, but then suddenly recoils. Even though Helios is only 9, she says she wanted to be sure that he does not mate with her. Apollo does not want anyone else to have her. If a man does mate with her he will be punished and Cassandra will lose her gift of prophecy. She then tells Helios that she does not know what she will say whenever she makes a prediction. She mentions one prediction told to Laomedon long ago; "Stone on stone will ever fall, at the dread Earth-Shaker's call." She tells Helios she feels that a spell is coming on and she will perform an oracle for Helios. She smells the salve to become in a "dreamy" state, and she speaks in a trance to Helios. A couple of lines of the oracle caused many thoughts to race in Helios' mind: "First, you ancient in the Earth, Judge for Troy what he is worth." Unaware of what she had just said, she asked Helios if he would remember the words exactly, but not to tell her what it was. She suggests to Helios that it would be a good idea for him to leave the roof, and he climbs down carefully.
Chapter 5: The next day Sisycles summons Helios to be taught writing by order of Priam. The next morning he is formally introduced to Cassandra, as it is supposed to be their first meeting. After the first lesson, Cassandra offers to teach Helios additional writing on her own time. She tells Helios that it was her that requested Helios be taught how to write. From that point on every second morning Helios had writing lessons from Sisycles, then Cassandra would give him additional writing lessons or other studies. Late that winter, Troy received news that the Achaen rulers are preparing to make war on Troy. Another serious announcement is made, a change to The Festival of the Scapegoat. This was a carnival marking the end of winter where a goat is sacrificed to eliminate all the sins of the city. This year, a man would be chosen. Names of men suspected of evil would be given to Priam. Sisycles would write the approved names on clay tablets. All the tablets would be left on until it rained, then 2 priests and Priam would choose the name that stands out most clearly. The person named would be sacrificed as the Scapegoat. The first day of sunshine came, and is Helios' 10th birthday. Helios and Cassandra celebrate by having snacks and wine, which in turn made them sleepy. They both undress and lay down on the roof naked to enjoy a sun bath. They are discovered on the roof by Queen Hecuba with a few guards. He is taken to Priam and questioned. We learn that Cassandra is only 15 years old. Hecuba demands that Helios be punished, but Priam is not sure if any wrong was done. They agree to enter Helios' name in the Festival of the Scapegoat. Helios' writing lessons stop, and Troy waits for rain. The day of the ceremony, Helios' name was the most legible and his tablet is chosen. Hector interrupts the ceremony and demands that his life be taken, but Priam denies him. Helios takes a close look at the tablet and points out that someone has switched the tablet, as this one was fired in a kiln, not dried out in the sun. Sisycles confirms that he did not create this tablet, and it must have been switched. Priam cannot decide the next course of action. Cassandra orders Helios to say the oracle of his fate. Helios says "First, you ancient in the Earth, Judge for Troy what he is worth." Priam says that the ancient in the Earth is a calling from Gaia, and Helios unwillingly appeals to her. Priam declares that they must seek an answer from her in order to find out Helios' fate.
Chapter 6: Formal arrangements were made to receive an oracle from the Gaia priestess. After nearly 2 weeks pass, the priestess approves. A party is formed to set out for the oracle. They stopped overnight at Lyrnessus and are welcomed by its ruler and his son Aeneas. They continue to the When they arrive Laocoön introduced the party to a handmaiden of the priestess, who inspected the gifts of Priam. The handmaiden only allowed Priam, Hector, Helios, Cassandra, and Helen to see the priestess. The priestess gave readings and chanted "Those who wish to chase a boy, will not succeed in saving Troy." The party was dismissed, and returned to Troy. Another Scapegoat was chosen.
Chapter 7: Soon after the return from the shrine Helios and Cassandra were allowed to resume their writing lessons with Sisycles as well as their private talks. One day in early summer the Achaean fleet arrives on the shores of Troy. Battle erupts by sea and on land. Helios follows Troilus and Polydextus, only to witness them killed by Achilles. Helios attempts to defeat Achilles by throwing rocks at him, but he is stopped by Odysseus. Diomedes steps forward leading a captive, Milentius. Milentius is then killed by Diomedes. The three Achaeans discuss what to do with Helios, and Achilles dons him a kitchen pot as a helmet and a ladle as a sword. He then orders his son Neoptolemus to fight Helios to the death.
Chapter 8: Neoptolemus wounds Helios in the fight with a slash to his ribs. Helios uses the ladle to scoop up embers from a nearby fire and throw them into Neoptolemus' helmet. Helios grabbed a bucket of water and threw in the boy's face. Achilles hates himself for "blinding his son", but Odysseus calls for Machaon to look at Neoptolemus' eyes. He says that the cold water may have saved Neoptolemus from blindness. Machaon leads Helios and the Achaeans to Achilles' tent set up on the beach. There he chants over Neoptolemus, and says it will be days before they know if Neoptolemus' sight would return. In that time, someone must drip medicine over Neoptolemus' eyes. Helios volunteers to stay and apply the medicine. Achilles reluctantly accepts, and leaves the tent under guard and arranges for another tent to be raised. Machaon stitches Helios' wound and leaves. When they are alone, Neoptolemus compliments Helios' fighting and then goes to sleep.

== About the author ==
In the fall of 1924 Powell began studying Virgil's Aeneid in Latin class at the Episcopal Academy, on Philadelphia's Main Line, and became fascinated by the characters and story of the Trojan War. Forty-four years later he climbed around the site of ancient Troy as part of his research for the book. (From the dust jacket of the 1970 edition published by Charles Scribner's Sons, New York.)

== See also ==
- Homer
- The Iliad
- The Odyssey
- List of Trojan War characters
