= Eugenia (given name) =

- Pronunciation: English: /juːˈdʒiːniə/ Greek: [evʝeˈnia] Italian: [euˈdʒɛːnja] Portuguese: [ewˈʒeniɐ] Galician: [uˈʃia] Spanish: [ewˈxenja] Catalan: [əwˈʒɛniə]
- Gender: Female

Origin
- Origin: Greek
- Meaning: nobility or "well-born"

Other names
- Related names: Eugenius, Eugenio, Eugene, Eugenie, Evgenia

Eugenia is a feminine first name related to the masculine name Eugene that comes from the Greek eugenes 'well-born', from eu- 'well' + genes 'born' (from genos).

Variants include Eugénia (Portuguese), Eugénie (French), Eugènia (Catalan), Uxía (Galician), Evgenia, Evyenia (Greek: Ευγενία), Eugenija (Lithuanian) and Yevgenia or Yevgeniya (Russian: Евгения; also transliterated as Evgenia or Evgeniya), In Ukraine the russianized form is Yevheniia, but the folk form of the name is Yivha (Євгенія).

== Notable people ==
- Eugenia of Rome (died c. 258), Roman Christian martyr
- Eugenia Smet (1825–1871), French nun, founder of the Society of the Helpers of the Holy Souls
- Princess Eugenia Maximilianovna of Leuchtenberg (1845–1925), French-Russian princess
- Eugenia Abu (born 1962), Nigerian journalist
- Eugenia Apostol (1925–2026), Filipino publisher
- Eugènia Balcells (1943–2026), Spanish Catalan artist
- Eugenia Bonetti, Italian nun
- Princess Eugenia de Jesús de Borbón y Vargas (born 2007), French-Spanish aristocrat
- Eugenia Brooks Frothingham (1874–1971), American novelist
- Eugenia Bujak, Lithuanian-Polish cyclist
- Eugenia Calle (1952–2009), American cancer epidemiologist
- Eugênia Câmara (1837–1879), Portuguese actress
- Eugenia Campbell Nowlin (1908–2003), American arts administrator, artist
- Eugenia Caruso, Italian actress and screenwriter
- Eugenia Cauduro (born 1968), Mexican actress
- Eugenia Shi-Chia Chang, South African Member of Parliament
- Eugenia Charles (1919–2005), Prime Minister of Dominica
- Eugenia Cheng, British mathematician, educator, and concert pianist
- Eugenia Chuprina (born 1971), Ukrainian poet, writer, and playwright
- Eugenia Clinchard (1909–1989), American child actress
- Eugenia Cooney (born 1994), American internet personality
- Eugenia "Eugene" Domingo (born 1971), Filipino actress, comedienne and host
- Eugenia Errázuriz (1860–1951), Chilean patroness of the arts
- Eugenia Falleni (1875–1939), Italian-Australian transgender man convicted of murder
- Eugenia Gabrieluk (born 1967), Russian pianist
- Eugenia Gómez de Diego (born 1976), Spanish politician
- Eugenia Kisimova (1831–1885), Bulgarian women's rights activist
- Eugenia Kuzmina (born 1987), Russian-American model and actress
- Eugenia Mandzhieva (born 1985), Russian fashion model and actress of Kalmyk descent
- Eugenia St. John Mann (1847-1932), American evangelist and temperance lecturer
- Eugenia Manolidou (born 1975), Greek composer and conductor
- Eugenia Malinnikova (born 1974), Russian mathematician
- Eugenia L. Mobley (1922–2011), American dentist, college dean
- Eugenia de Montijo (1826–1920), wife of Napoleon III of France
- Eugenia Nobel (1912–1999), German writer
- Eugenia Parry Janis (born 1940), American art historian
- Eugenia Paul (1935–2010), American actress and dancer
- Eugenia del Pino (born 1945), Ecuadorian developmental biologist
- Eugenia Popa (born 1973), Romanian gymnast
- Eugenia Popescu-Județ (1925–2011), Romanian dancer
- Eugenia Price (1916–1996), American author
- Eugenia Rasponi (1873–1958), Italian noblewoman, suffragist, and businesswoman
- Eugenia Ravasio (1907–1990), Italian Catholic nun and mystic
- Eugenia Silva (born 1976), Spanish model
- Eugenia Smith (1899–1997), claimed to be Grand Duchess Anastasia Nikolaevna of Russia
- Eugenia Gil Soriano (born 1996), Spanish football referee
- Eugenia D. Soru (1901–1988), Romanian chemist
- Eugenia Tenenbaum (born 1996), Spanish art historian, feminist and LGBTQ rights activist
- Eugenia Triantafyllou, Greek speculative fiction author and artist
- Eugenia Tsoumani-Spentza (died 2020), Greek politician
- Eugenia Tymoshenko (born 1980), Ukrainian entrepreneur and activist
- Eugenia Martínez Vallejo (1674-1699), Spanish court jester
- Eugenia Volodina (born 1984), Russian supermodel
- Eugenia Washington (1838–1900), American Catholic historian, civil servant, and one of the founders of Daughters of the American Revolution
- Eugenia Williamson Hume (1865–1899), American elocutionist and educator
- Eugenia Yuan (born 1976), American gymnast and actress
- Eugenia Zamora (born 1957), Costa Rican jurist and public official
- Eugenia Zukerman (born 1944), American flautist

== Fictional characters ==
- Eugenia Münster, main character in The Europeans
- Eugenia, central figure in Eduardo Urzaiz’s 1919 novel Eugenia: A Fictional Sketch of Future Customs
- Eugenia "Skeeter" Phelan, a protagonist in The Help
- Eugenia Randolph Lord, a character in One Life to Live
- Eugenia Dermody, a character in season 1 of Ozark
- Eugenia, a minor character in season 1 and 2 of Snowpiercer
- Eugenia Lightwood, character in The Shadowhunter Chronicles
- Eugenia Ferdinand-Ferdinand, minor animated character in Legend of the Three Caballeros
- Eugenia Kisskillya, minor animated character in Histeria!
