= Eugénie =

Eugenie
- Pronunciation: /juːˈdʒiːni/ French: [øʒeni]
- Gender: Female

Other names
- Related names: Eugenia, Eugene, Eugenius

Eugénie is the French version of the female given name Eugenia.

Eugénie or Eugenie may refer to:

== People ==
- Eugénie d'Alsace (died 735), Second abbess of Mont Sainte-Odile Abbey
- Eugénie de Montijo (1826–1920), 9th Countess de Teba; later Empress Eugénie, Empress Consort to Napoléon III
- Eugénie du Colombier (1806–1888) French painter
- Princess Eugenie of Sweden and Norway (1830–1889), of the House of Bernadotte
- Victoria Eugenie of Battenberg (1887-1969), Queen consort of Spain and a granddaughter of Queen Victoria
- Princess Eugénie of Bourbon (born 2007), French-Spanish royal
- Princess Eugénie of Greece and Denmark (1910–1989)
- Princess Eugenie of York (born 1990), British princess, daughter of Andrew Mountbatten-Windsor and Sarah Ferguson
- Eugenie Anderson (1909–1997), US ambassador, first woman appointed chief of mission at the ambassador level in US history
- Eugenie Besserer (1868–1934), French silent film actress
- Eugénie Blanchard (1896–2010), French supercentenarian
- Eugenie Bonaparte (1872–1949), aristocrat
- Eugenie Bouchard (born 1994), Canadian tennis and pickleball player
- Eugenie Clark (1922–2015), American ichthyologist
- Eugénie Cotton (1881–1967), French physicist, socialist, women's rights advocate
- Eugenie Mary Ladenburg Davie (1895–1975), New York Republican activist
- Eugenie Forde (1879–1940), American silent film actress
- Eugenie Fougère (1870–?), French vaudeville and music hall singer and dancer
- Eugenie Fribourg (1908–2007), American physician
- Eugénie de Gramont (1788–1846), French nun of the Society of the Sacred Heart
- Eugénie de Guérin (1805–1848), French writer
- Eugénie D'Hannetaire (1746–1816), French actress
- Eugénie Henderson (1914–1989), British linguist and academic
- Eugénie Hunsicker, American mathematician working in England
- Eugénie De Keyser (1918–2012), Belgian writer
- Eugenie Lautensach-Löffler (1902–1987), German geographer and local historian
- Eugenie Leontovich (between 1893 and 1900 – 1993), Russian-American stage actress
- Eugénie Potonié-Pierre (1844–1898), French feminist
- Eugénie Rocherolle (born 1936), American composer, pianist, lyricist and teacher
- Eugenie Sage (born 1957 or 1958), New Zealand politician and environmentalist
- Eugenie Schwarzwald (1872–1940), Austrian philanthropist
- Eugenie Scott (born 1945), American physical anthropologist
- Eugenie Mikhailovna Shakhovskaya (1889–1920), Russian pioneering aviator, first female military pilot
- Eugénie Söderberg (1903–1973), Swedish-American writer and journalist
- Eugénie Le Sommer (born 1989), French female footballer
- Eugenie van Leeuwen (born 1970), Dutch cricketer
- Eugénie Louise Zobian (born 1948), more commonly known as Lisa Lindahl, American inventor of the sports bra

== Fictional characters ==
- The principal character of Philosophy in the Bedroom (La Philosophie dans le boudoir), a 1795 book by the Marquis de Sade
- Eugénie Danglars in The Count of Monte Cristo
- Eugenie Grandet in the eponymous novel by Honoré de Balzac
- Eugénie Sandler in Eugenie Sandler P.I. an Australian television series
- Eugenie Markham in Richelle Mead's Dark Swan series
- Eugenie Victoria is the given name of Bonnie Butler in Gone with the Wind
- Eugénie is the name of the weapon smith in the 2023 video game Lies of P
- Eugenie, a character from the animated series Zip Zip
- Eugénie, main character in The Taste of Things

== Other ==
- Eugenie… The Story of Her Journey into Perversion a 1970 film
