= List of The Links members =

The Links is an American social and service organization of prominent black women. It was founded in 1946 in Philadelphia, Pennsylvania. As of 2021, it has more than 17,000 members in 299 chapters. A list of some of The Links' notables members follows.

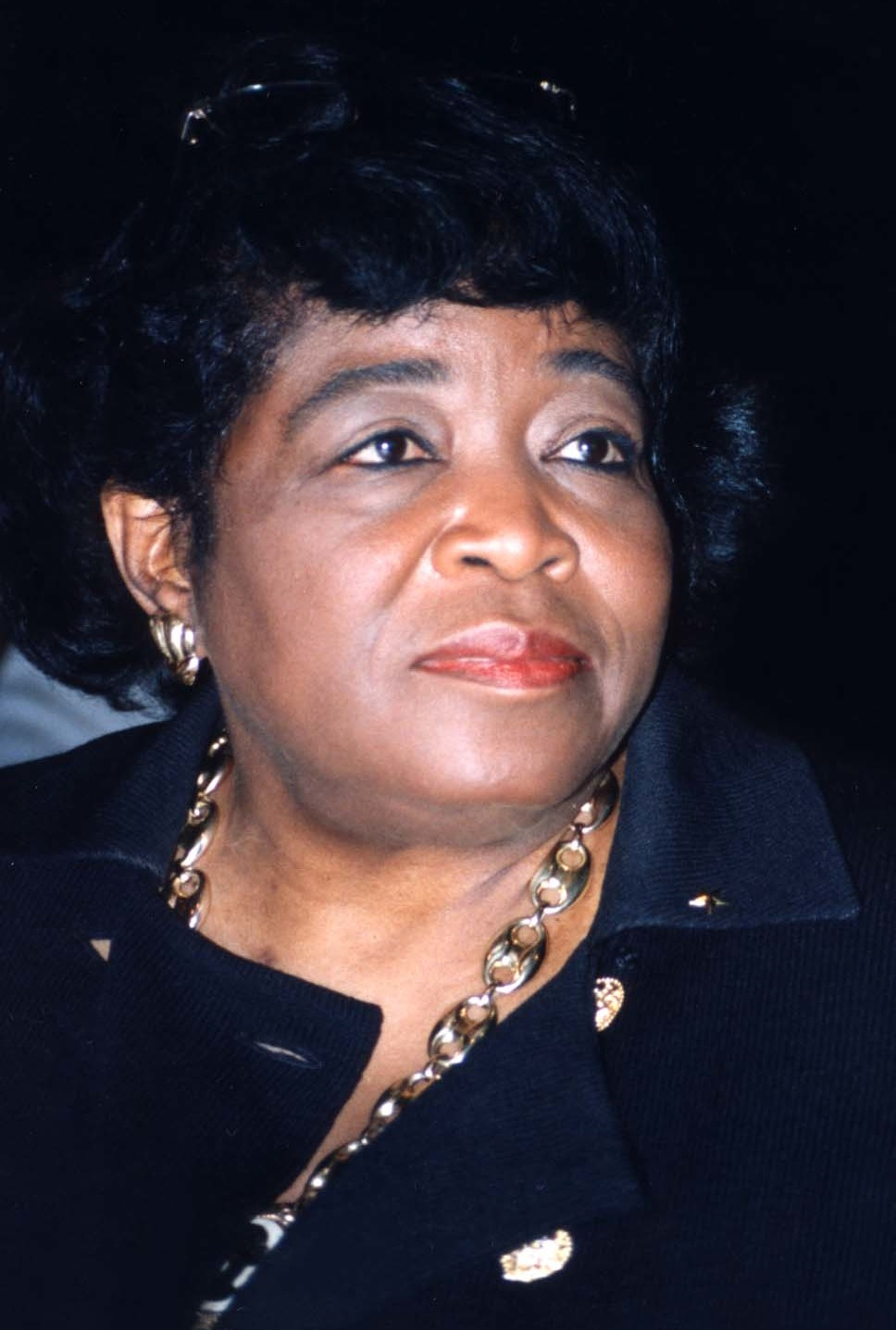
Betty Shabazz

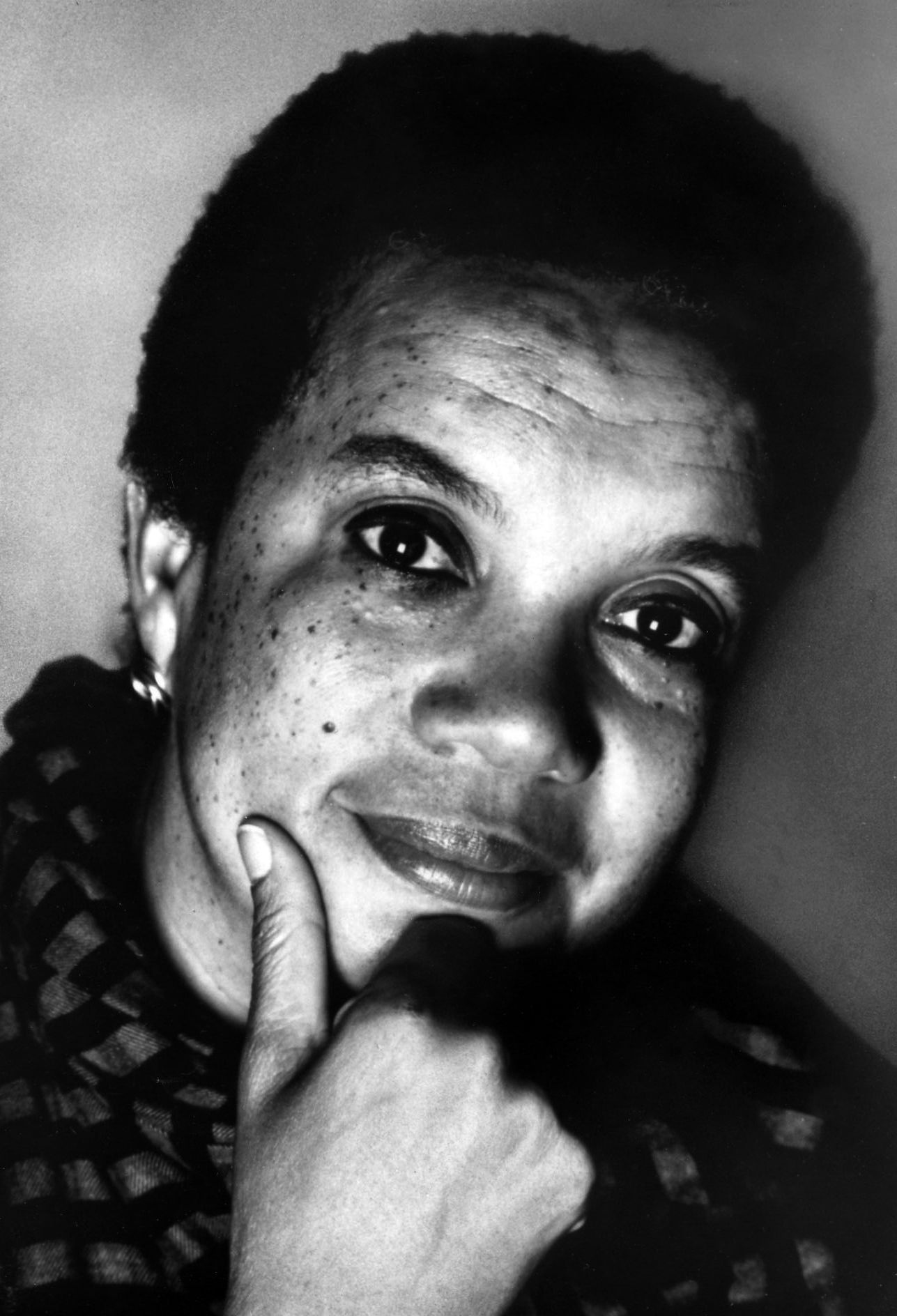
Marian Wright Edelman

Name	Chapter	Notability	References
Stacy Abrams	Atlanta	Georgia House of Representatives	
Hannah Atkins		Oklahoma Secretary of State and Oklahoma House of Representatives	
Marian Anderson	Honorary	Contralto	
Etta Moten Barnett		Actress and contralto vocalist	
Cheri Beasley	Triangle Park	Chief Justice of the North Carolina Supreme Court	
Joyce Beatty		United States House of Representatives and Ohio House of Representatives	
Anita Lyons Bond		Civil rights activist and academic	
Keisha Lance Bottoms		Mayor of Atlanta, Senior Advisor to the President of the United States, and director of the White House Office of Public Liaison	
Gwendolyn Boyd		President of Alabama State University and mechanical engineer at the Johns Hopkins University Applied Physics Laboratory	
Johnnetta Cole		President of Spelman College and Bennett College; director of the Smithsonian Institution's National Museum of African Art	
Misty Copeland	Honorary 2022	Ballet dancer for American Ballet Theatre	
Val Demings		United States House of Representatives	
Mattiwilda Dobbs	Honorary 1973	Opera singer with the Metropolitan Opera	
Marian Wright Edelman		Founder and president emerita of the Children's Defense Fund	
Helen G. Edmonds		Professor and chair of the Department of History and dean of the Graduate School of Arts and Sciences at North Carolina College (now North Carolina Central University)	
Amanda Edwards		Member of the Houston City Council	
Kamala Harris	Honorary 2018	Vice President of the United States, United States Senate, and Attorney General of California	
Patricia Roberts Harris	Honorary 1978	United States Secretary of Health and Human Services, United States Secretary of Housing and Urban Development, and United States Ambassador to Luxembourg	
Mary Gibson Hundley		Teacher at Dunbar High School, Miner Teacher's College, Eastern High School, and Howard University	
Sheila Jackson Lee		United States House of Representatives and member of the Houston City Council	
Jo Ann Jenkins		CEO of AARP	
Eddie Bernice Johnson		United States House of Representatives and Texas Senate	
Edith Irby Jones		physician and first woman president of the National Medical Association	
Elaine Jones		President and director-counsel of the NAACP Legal Defense Fund	
Ann Jordan		Director of the Department of Social Services for the University of Chicago Medical Center	
Barbara Jordan		United States House of Representatives and Texas Senate	
Elizabeth Duncan Koontz	Honorary 1984	Director of the United States Women's Bureau	
Thelma Patten Law		Physician	
Pauline Weeden Maloney		Rector of Norfolk State University.	
Veronica Mallett		Urogynecologist and senior vice president and chief administrative officer of the More in Common Alliance (MICA)	
Annette March-Grier		President of Roberta's House Inc.	
Eugenia L. Mobley		Dean of the Dental School and vice-president at Meharry Medical College	
Constance Baker Motley	Honorary 1980	Senior Judge of the United States District Court for the Southern District of New York and New York Senate	
Rosa Parks	Honorary 2003	Civil rights activist associated with the Montgomery bus boycott	
Sharon Pratt		Mayor of the District of Columbia and treasurer of the Democratic National Committee	
Ayanna Pressley		United States House of Representatives and member of the Boston City Council	
Leontyne Price	Honorary 1988	Spinto soprano with the Metropolitan Opera	
Hazel R. O'Leary		United States Secretary of Energy and president of Fisk University	
Danielle Outlaw		Commissioner of the Philadelphia Police Department and chief Portland Police Bureau	
Condoleezza Rice	Honorary 2013	United States Secretary of State, United States National Security Advisor, director of the Hoover Institution, and provost of Stanford University	
Jo Ann Robinson		Activist during the Civil Rights Movement and educator in Montgomery, Alabama	
Tami Sawyer		Civil rights activist and local politician	
Betty Shabazz		Civil rights advocate and wife of Malcolm X	
Ellen Johnson Sirleaf	Honorary 2010	President of Liberia	
Marian Spencer		Vice Mayor of the Cincinnati City Council	
Juliana Stratton	Chicago	Lieutenant Governor of Illinois and Illinois House of Representatives	
Evelyn Reid Syphax		Educator who was chair of the Arlington Public Schools Board	
Pat Timmons-Goodson		Associate justice of the North Carolina Supreme Court	
Yvonne Walker-Taylor		President of Wilberforce University	
Carmen J. Walters	Gulf Coast 2017 / Jackson	President of Tougaloo College	
Susie Ione Brown Waxwood		Philanthropist and clubwoman	
Frederica Wilson		United States House of Representatives, Florida Senate, and Florida House of Representatives	
Mary Wineberg	Cincinnati	Gold medalist in the 2008 Summer Olympics for track and field athlete	

== See also ==
- List of The Links chapters
