= Eugenia (disambiguation) =

Eugenia is a genus of plants. Eugenia may also refer to:

- Eugenia (fly), A fly in the family Tachinidae
- Eugenia, Ontario, Canada
- Eugenia (given name), and persons bearing it
- Eugenia (Lady of Quality), a pseudonym used by an unknown 18th century protofeminist pamphleteer
- Eugenia (telenovela), in Mexico
- The Eugenia, a 1964 English contract law case
- Eugenia metro station, in Mexico City, Mexico
- Eugenia (Mexico City Metrobús), a BRT station in Mexico City
- SS Eugenia, 1950s and '60s name for SS Empire Conrad
- 45 Eugenia, an asteroid
- Eugenia (Joplin), a 1906 composition by Scott Joplin

== See also ==
- Eugenius (disambiguation)
- Eugene (disambiguation)
