= List of The Links chapters =

The Links is an American social and service organization of prominent black women. It was founded in 1946 in Philadelphia, Pennsylvania. The Links is organized into four geographic areas: Central, Eastern, Southern, and Western.

The following are The Links chapters, with active chapters indicated in bold and inactive chapters in italics.

Chapter	Charter date and range	Location	Area	Status	Ref.
Aiken	April 22, 1989	Aiken, South Carolina	Southern	Active	
Alameda Contra Costa	February 9, 1985	Alameda, California	Western	Active	
Albany	1983	Albany, Georgia	Southern	Active	
Albany District	1952	Albany, New York	Eastern	Active	
Albuquerque	1950	Albuquerque, New Mexico	Western	Active	
Alexandria		Alexandria, Louisiana	Southern	Inactive	
Altamonte Springs	May 31, 1986	Altamonte Springs, Florida	Southern	Inactive	
Anchorage	1950 – xxxx ?; May 4, 2001	Anchorage, Alaska	Western	Active	
Angel City	February 1963	Los Angeles, California	Western	Active	
Ann Arbor	March 10, 1979	Ann Arbor, Michigan	Central	Active	
Annapolis	August 20, 1962	Annapolis, Maryland	Eastern	Active	
Archway	August 14, 1993	St. Louis, Missouri	Central	Active	
Arlington	1966	Arlington, Virginia	Eastern	Active	
Asheville	December 10, 1988	Asheville, North Carolina	Southern	Active	(Note: Chapter was formed from the Women Interested in Service and Success (WISS), established on August 24, 1986, as an interest group to join The Links.)
Athens	May 1, 2004	Athens, Georgia	Southern	Active	
Atlanta	February 1953	Atlanta, Georgia	Southern	Active	
Atlantic City	February 28, 1948	Atlantic City, New Jersey	Eastern	Active	
Augusta	November 23, 1957	Augusta, Georgia	Southern	Active	
Austin	December 9, 1960	Austin, Texas	Western	Active	
Azalea City	June 26, 1999	Atlanta, Georgia	Southern	Active	
Bakersfield	1977	Bakersfield, California	Western	Active	
Baltimore	1952	Baltimore, Maryland	Eastern	Active	
Baton Rouge	November 28, 1964	Baton Rouge, Louisiana	Southern	Active	
Bergen County	March 2, 1974	Bergen County, New Jersey	Eastern	Active	
Beverly Hills West	May 25, 1985	Beverly Hills, California	Western	Active	
Birmingham	February 4, 1956	Birmingham, Alabama	Southern	Active	
Bold City	May 29, 1993	Jacksonville, Florida	Southern	Active	
Boston	1952	Boston, Massachusetts	Eastern	Active	
Bradenton/Sarasota	February 10, 1996	Sarasota, Florida	Southern	Active	
Brevard County	1979	Rockledge, Florida	Southern	Active	
Brooklyn	November 15, 1952	Brooklyn, New York	Eastern	Active	
Brunswick	December 10, 1966	Brunswick, Georgia	Southern	Active	
Buckhead/Cascade City	June 27, 1996	Atlanta, Georgia	Southern	Active	
Bucks County	October 29, 1966	Doylestown, Pennsylvania	Eastern	Active	
Buffalo	May 26, 1950	Buffalo, New York	Eastern	Active	
Camellia Rose	November 7, 2009	Atlanta, Georgia	Southern	Active	
Capital City	1961	Washington, D.C.	Eastern	Active	
Carolina Pines	March 8, 2022	Concord, North Carolina	Southern	Active	
Central Illinois	November 3, 1975	Bloomington, Illinois	Central	Active	(Note: Chapter was formed as the Normal-Champaign chapter but changed its name to the Central Illinois in December 1996 to be inclusive of its service area that includes Bloomington-Normal, Champaign-Urbana, Charleston, Decatur, Peoria, and Springfield.)
Central Massachusetts	June 9, 2018	Worcester, Massachusetts	Eastern	Active	
Central Missouri	April 30, 2016	Columbia, Missouri	Central	Active	
Central New Jersey	March 28, 1951	New Brunswick, New Jersey	Eastern	Active	
Channel Islands	1982	Camarillo, California	Western	Active	
Charleston	1951	Charleston, South Carolina	Southern	Active	
Charleston-Institute	May 12, 1951	Charleston, West Virginia	Central	Active	
Charlotte	December 3, 1955	Charlotte, North Carolina	Southern	Active	
Charlottesville	March 1998	Charlottesville, Virginia	Eastern	Active	
Chattanooga	March 24, 1979	Chattanooga, Tennessee	Central	Active	
Chesapeake/Virginia Beach	1976	Virginia Beach, Virginia	Eastern	Active	
Cherry Blossom	February 2025	Washington, D.C.	Eastern	Active	
Chicago	1950	Chicago, Illinois	Central	Active	
Cincinnati	March 30, 1950	Cincinnati, Ohio	Central	Active	
Circle City	November 18, 1995	Indianapolis, Indiana	Central	Active	(Note: Chapter formed from The Hoosier Capital League, incorporated in February 1995 to become an interest group for The Links.)
Claremont Area	May 26, 1985	Upland, California	Western	Active	
Cleveland	1950	Cleveland, Ohio	Central	Active	
Colorado Springs	May 2, 2015	Colorado Springs, Colorado	Western	Active	
Columbia (MD)	June 28, 1975	Columbia, Maryland	Eastern	Active	
Columbia (SC)	April 15, 1952	Columbia, South Carolina	Southern	Active	
Columbus (GA)	December 19, 1964	Columbus, Georgia	Southern	Active	
Columbus (OH)	1950	Columbus, Ohio	Central	Active	
Commonwealth	1998	Richmond, Virginia	Eastern	Active	
Cream City	March 1990	Milwaukee, Wisconsin	Central	Active	(Note: Chapter formed from the Cream City Suburban Service Club, established in 1988.)
Crescent City	June 2, 1984	New Orleans, Louisiana	Southern	Active	(Note: This chapter was formed from the Suburban Arts Guild, established on March 28, 1981, to become a chapter of The Links.)
Crown Jewels	1993	Charlotte, North Carolina	Southern	Active	
Dade County	June 1, 1986	Miami, Florida	Southern	Active	
Dallas	December 1957	Dallas, Texas	Western	Active	
Danville	November 15, 1953	Danville, Virginia	Eastern	Active	
Dayton	May 28, 1949	Dayton, Ohio	Central	Active	
Daytona Beach	1983	Daytona Beach, Florida	Southern	Active	
Delaware Valley	November 21, 1964	Philadelphia, Pennsylvania	Eastern	Active	
Denver	1952	Denver, Colorado	Western	Active	
Des Moines	November 9, 1957	Des Moines, Iowa	Central	Active	
Detroit	November 9, 1946	Detroit, Michigan	Central	Active	
Dogwood City	1982	Atlanta, Georgia	Southern	Active	
Dover	April 1986	Dover, Delaware	Eastern	Active	
Durham	October 11, 1958	Durham, North Carolina	Southern	Active	
East Texas	December 1952	Tyler, Texas	Western	Active	(Note: The chapter covers Marshall, Tyler, and Longview, Texas.)
Eastern Shore	1998	Wheatley Heights, New York	Eastern	Active	
Eden Rose	February 6, 2010	San Leandro, California	Western	Active	
El Paso	September 17, 1977	El Paso, Texas	Western	Active	
Elizabeth City		Elizabeth City, North Carolina	Southern	Active	
Erie County	October 3, 1987	Amherst, New York	Eastern	Active	
Essex County	1986	West Orange, New Jersey	Eastern	Active	
Farmington Valley	April 28, 1979	West Hartford, Connecticut	Eastern	Active	
Fairfield County	May 15, 1976	Fairfield County, Connecticut	Eastern	Active	
Fayetteville	February 11, 1951	Fayetteville, North Carolina	Southern	Active	
Flint Area	1979	Flint, Michigan	Central	Active	
Fort Bend County	March 2, 1996	Sugar Land, Texas	Western	Active	
Fort Lauderdale	September 21, 1974	Fort Lauderdale, Florida	Southern	Active	
Fort Valley	March 1, 1969	Fort Valley, Georgia	Southern	Active	
Fort Wayne	March 24, 1979	Fort Wayne, Indiana	Central	Active	
Fort Worth	December 5, 1959	Fort Worth, Texas	Western	Active	
Frankfort/Lexington	December 19, 1968	Lexington, Kentucky	Central	Active	
Fresno	1977	Fresno, California	Western	Active	
Gainesville	May 18, 1985	Gainesville, Florida	Southern	Active	(Note: Chapter formed from F.O.C.U.S. (Females Organized for the Challenges of Unity and Self Awareness), a local civic organization established in 1978.)
Gateway	May 3, 1986	East St. Louis, Illinois	Central	Active	(Note: Chapter formed from MELIG (Metro-East Links Interest Group), established eighteen months earlier to become a chapter of The Links. It serves St. Louis, Missouri; East St. Louis, Illinois; and communities within a fifty-mile radius of those cities.)
Golden Crest	March 5, 1995	Columbus, Mississippi	Southern	Active	(Note: This chapter serves Columbus and Lowndes County, Mississippi.)
Golden Triangle	May 8, 1971	Beaumont, Texas	Western	Active	(Note: This chapter cover Beaumont, Port Arthur, and Orange, Texas.)
Grandiflora	August 2017	Greensboro, North Carolina	Southern	Active	(Note: The chapter was formed from The Grand Magnolias, established in 2017 with the intent of becoming a chapter of The Links.)
Great Lakes	January 30, 1993	Southfield, Michigan	Central	Active	
Greater Bronx	May 31, 2014	Bronx, New York	Eastern	Active	(Note: Chapter formed from the Bronx Women’s Service League, established on February 26, 2013.)
Greater Broward County	April 24, 2022	Hollywood, Florida	Southern	Active	
Greater Denton County	June 9, 2012	Lewisville, Texas	Western	Active	
Greater Hartford	May 31, 1986	Hartford, Connecticut	Eastern	Active	
Greater Hudson Valley	1990	White Plains, New York	Eastern	Active	
Greater Huntsville	September 20, 1997	Huntsville, Alabama	Southern	Active	
Greater Miami	November 5, 1955	Miami, Florida	Southern	Active	
Greater Mobile	March 1990	Mobile, Alabama	Southern	Active	
Greater New York	May 21, 1949	New York City, New York	Eastern	Active	
Greater Pearland Area	June 14, 2014	Houston, Texas	Western	Active	
Greater Providence	April 8, 1995	Providence, Rhode Island	Eastern	Active	
Greater Queens	March 9, 1996	Queens, New York	Eastern	Active	
Greater Rappahannock	2014	Fredericksburg, Virginia	Eastern	Active	
Greater Seattle	December 1955	Seattle, Washington	Western	Active	
Greater Springfield	May 31, 1986	Springfield, Massachusetts	Eastern	Active	
Greater Twin Cities	April 30, 2022	St. Louis Park, Minnesota	Central	Active	
Greater Wayne County	August 1, 1981	Southfield, Michigan	Central	Active	
Greensboro	October 22, 1955	Greensboro, North Carolina	Southern	Active	
Greenville	1953	Greenville, South Carolina	Southern	Active	
Gulf Coast	November 18, 2017	Biloxi, Mississippi	Southern	Active	
Gulf Coast Apollo	August 1995	Houston, Texas	Western	Active	
Hampton	1952	Hampton, Virginia	Eastern	Active	
Harbor Area	November 6, 1966	Long Beach, California	Western	Active	(Note: Chapter serves Long Beach, Compton, and South Los Angeles, California.)
Harbor City	1985	Baltimore, Maryland	Eastern	Active	
Harbor Lites	April 23, 1994	Waukegan, Illinois	Central	Active	(Note: Chapter formed from the Harbor City Club, established to become a chapter of The Links.)
Harrisburg	2009	Harrisburg, Pennsylvania	Eastern	Active	
Hawaii	January 11, 1986	Mililani, Hawaii	Western	Active	
Hendersonville	August 14, 1976	Nashville, Tennessee	Central	Active	
Hilton Head	November 4, 2017	Hilton Head Island, South Carolina	Southern	Active	(Note: Chapter formed from the Magnolias of Hilton Head, an interest group established in 2014 to become a chapter of The Links.)
Hoffman Estates	May 12, 1984	Hoffman Estates, Illinois	Central	Active	(Note: This chapter serves the Elgin and Northwest Chicago suburban communities.)
Houston	1951	Houston, Texas	Western	Active	
Huntington	November 12, 1955	Huntington, West Virginia	Central	Active	
Indianapolis	March 17, 1951	Indianapolis, Indiana	Central	Active	
Inglewood Pacific	May 6, 1979	Los Angeles, California	Western	Active	
Jackson (MS)	1959	Jackson, Mississippi	Southern	Active	
Jackson (TN)	1964	Jackson, Tennessee	Central	Active	
Jackson County	July 25, 1981	Lee's Summit, Missouri	Central	Active	
Jacksonville	November 12, 1966	Jacksonville, Florida	Southern	Active	
James River Valley	May 14, 1983	Richmond, Virginia	Eastern	Active	
Jersey Shore	April 23, 2022	New Jersey	Eastern	Active	
Kalamazoo	April 28, 2001	Kalamazoo, Michigan	Central	Active	
Katy-Richmond Area	April 14, 2018	Katy and Richmond, Texas	Western	Active	
Kent Area	June 19, 1976	Kent, Ohio	Central	Active	
Knoxville	November 14, 1970	Knoxville, Tennessee	Central	Active	
La Capitale	April 12, 1986	Baton Rouge, Louisiana	Southern	Active	
LaGrange	June 30, 1979	LaGrange, Georgia	Southern	Active	(Note: The chapter includes Coweta County, Fayette County, Haralson County, Harris County, Heard County, Meriwether County, Talbot County, and Troup County in Georgia, as well as Chambers County, Lee County, and Randolph County in Alabama.)
Lake Gaston Area	May 22, 1982	Halifax County, North Carolina	Southern	Active	(Note: Chapter formed from the Northeastern North Carolina Elites, an interest group established in 1980 to become a chapter of The Links.)
Lake Shore	January 20, 1996	Chicago, Illinois	Central	Active	
Lansing/East Lansing	October 28, 1972	Lansing, Michigan	Central	Active	(Note: Chapter formed from TIL (Those Interested in Links), established in 1970 to became a chapter of The Links.)
Las Vegas	May 27, 1976	Las Vegas, Nevada	Western	Active	
LeFleur’s Bluff	March 5, 1988	Jackson, Mississippi	Southern	Active	
Little Rock	January 1956	Little Rock, Arkansas	Central	Active	
London	2018	London, England	Eastern	Active	
Lone Star	April 26, 2014	Round Rock, Texas	Western	Active	
Long Island	October 27, 1962	Manhasset, New York	Eastern	Active	
Los Angeles	September 1950	Los Angeles, California	Western	Active	
Loudoun County	December 5, 2020	Broadlands, Virginia	Eastern	Active	
Louisville	October 13, 1951	Louisville, Kentucky	Central	Active	
Lynchburg	1950	Lynchburg, Virginia	Eastern	Active	
Macon	October 8, 1972	Macon, Georgia	Southern	Active	
Madison Metropolitan	1985	Madison, Wisconsin	Central	Active	
Magic City	August 21, 1993	Birmingham, Alabama	Southern	Active	
Magnolia	March 1991	Atlanta, Georgia	Southern	Active	(Note: Chapter formed from the Magnolia Club (local), organized on September 7, 1986.)
Memphis	1952	Memphis, Tennessee	Central	Active	
Metro-Manhattan	April 23, 1988	Manhattan, New York	Eastern	Active	
Metropolitan	August 11, 1979	Washington, D.C.	Eastern	Active	
Miami-Biscayne Bay	June 30, 2010	Miami, Florida	Southern	Active	
Mid-Cities	April 20, 1985	Irving, Texas	Western	Active	
Middlesex County	1976	Acton, Massachusetts	Eastern	Active	
Midland	1973	Midland, Texas	Western	Inactive	
Milford	May 17, 1986	Milford, Connecticut	Eastern	Active	
Milwaukee	December 8, 1962	Milwaukee, Wisconsin	Central	Active	
Minneapolis/St. Paul	December 10, 1972	Minneapolis, Minnesota	Central	Active	
Mississippi Delta	2012	Clarksdale, Mississippi	Southern	Active	(Note: Chapter serves Bolivar County, Coahoma County, Leflore County, Panola County, Quitman County, Sunflower County, Tallahatchie County, Tunica County, and Washington County, Mississippi.)
Mississippi Roses	October 31, 2015	Holly Springs, Mississippi	Southern	Active	(Note: Chapter covers Benton County, DeSoto County, Lafayette County, Marshall County, and Union County, Mississippi.)
Missouri City	May 12, 1979	Houston, Texas	Western	Active	
Monroe-Grambling		Grambling, Louisiana	Southern	Active	
Monterey Bay	November 16, 1974	Seaside, California	Western	Active	
Montgomery	December 8, 1958	Montgomery, Alabama	Southern	Active	
Montgomery County	1975	Blue Bell, Pennsylvania	Eastern	Active	
Morris County	May 1982	Morristown, New Jersey	Eastern	Active	
Mount Rose	June 4, 2016	Fort Washington, Maryland	Eastern	Active	
Music City	June 27, 1981	Nashville, Tennessee	Central	Active	
Nashville	November 17, 1952	Nashville, Tennessee	Central	Active	
Nassau	1989	Nassau, New Providence, The Bahamas	Southern	Active	
Natchez	1961	Natchez, Mississippi	Southern	Active	(Note: This chapter includes Adams, Amite, Claiborne, Jefferson, Lawrence, Lincoln, Pike, and Wilkinson Counties of Mississippi and Concordia Parish, Louisiana.)
New Haven	December 18, 1972	Hamden, Connecticut	Eastern	Active	
New Orleans	November 20, 1957	New Orleans, Louisiana	Southern	Active	
Newport News	February 1952	Newport News, Virginia	Eastern	Active	
Niagara Falls	May 24, 1950	Niagara Falls, New York	Eastern	Active	
Norfolk	February 1952	Norfolk, Virginia	Eastern	Active	
North Broward County	May 1995	Coral Springs, Florida	Southern	Active	
North Jersey	June 1949	West Orange, New Jersey	Eastern	Active	
North Shore	November 19, 1972	Evanston, Illinois	Central	Active	
Northern Indiana	November 1, 1958	Gary, Indiana	Central	Active	
Northwest	April 28, 2018	Bentonville, Arkansas	Central	Active	
Oakland Bay Area	September 23, 1950	Oakland, California	Western	Active	
Oakland County	May 17, 1981	Oakland County, Michigan	Central	Active	
Oklahoma City	November 1957	Oklahoma City, Oklahoma	Central	Active	
Old Dominion	September 18, 1993	Woodbridge, Virginia	Eastern	Active	
Omaha	September 30, 1950	Omaha, Nebraska	Central	Active	
Orange County	1973	Gardena, California	Western	Active	
Orangeburg	December 4, 1964	Orangeburg, South Carolina	Southern	Active	
Orlando	April 5, 1952	Orlando, Florida	Southern	Active	
Palos Verdes	1982	Palos Verdes Estates, California	Western	Active	
Parthenon		Nashville, Tennessee	Central	Active	
Pasadena-Altadena	1966	Pasadena, California	Western	Active	
Passaic County	1961	Paterson, New Jersey	Eastern	Active	
Patapsco River	March 31, 1990	Owings Mills, Maryland	Eastern	Active	
Patuxent River	June 27, 2014	Gaithersburg, Maryland	Eastern	Active	
Peninsula Bay	November 5, 1960	San Mateo and Santa Clara, California	Western	Active	
Penn Towne	1975	Flourtown, Pennsylvania	Eastern	Active	
Pensacola	November 25, 1972	Pensacola, Florida	Southern	Active	
Petersburg	May 7, 1948	Petersburg, Virginia	Eastern	Active	
Philadelphia	November 9, 1946	Philadelphia, Pennsylvania	Eastern	Active	
Phoenix	1952	Phoenix, Arizona	Western	Active	
Piedmont	May 1, 1982	Gastonia, North Carolina	Southern	Active	(Note: The chapter was formed from the Tri-County Service League, established in 1979 to become a chapter of The Links.) (Note: This chapter covers Gaston, Catawba, Cleveland, Mecklenburg, Cabarrus, Lincoln, Iredell, and Rowan counties in North Carolina and Lancaster and York counties in South Carolina.)
Pine Bluff	May 17, 1969	Pine Bluff, Arkansas	Central	Active	
Pittsburgh	December 5, 1948	Pittsburgh, Pennsylvania	Eastern	Active	
Plano North Metroplex	April 1, 1989	Plano, Texas	Western	Active	
Pontchartrain	May 28, 1994	New Orleans, Louisiana	Southern	Active	(Note: Chapter was formed from the Metropolitan Area Guild, established in 1989, to become a chapter of The Links.)
Port City	May 16, 1987	Houston, Texas	Western	Active	(Note: Chapter was formed by the Metropolitan Women's League, founded in 1985 in Houston, Texas.)
Portland	1957	Portland, Oregon	Western	Active	
Portsmouth	December 30, 1950	Portsmouth, Virginia	Eastern	Active	
Potomac	1984	Greater Washington, D.C.	Eastern	Active	
Prince George's County	March 24, 1979	Mitchellville, Maryland	Eastern	Active	
Princess Anne	March 15, 1969	Princess Anne, Maryland	Eastern	Active	
Quad Cities	1961	Moline, Illinois	Central	Active	
Queen City		West Chester, Ohio	Central	Active	
Raleigh	April 18, 1949	Raleigh, North Carolina	Southern	Active	
Rancocas Valley	October 26, 1974	Willingboro, New Jersey	Eastern	Active	
Raritan Valley	April 26, 1986	Somerset, New Jersey	Eastern	Active	
Renaissance	1987	Rochester, Michigan	Central	Active	(Note: Chapter formed from the Michigan Innovators Group (M.I.G.), established in 1985.)
Reston	1975	Reston, Virginia	Eastern	Active	
Richmond	1952	Richmond, Virginia	Eastern	Active	
River City	May 15, 1993	Memphis, Tennessee	Central	Active	(Note: Chapter formed from the River City Sette, established in 1987.)
Roanoke		Roanoke, Virginia	Eastern	Active	
Rochester	1961	Rochester, New York	Eastern	Active	
Sacramento	1952	Sacramento, California	Western	Active	
St. Louis	1961	St. Louis, Missouri	Central	Active	
St. Petersburg	June 27, 1987	St. Petersburg, Florida	Southern	Active	(Note: The St. Petersburg – Tampa chapter split into the St. Petersburg and Tampa chapters in 1987.)
St. Petersburg–Tampa	May 26, 1951 – June 26, 1987	St. Petersburg and Tampa, Florida	Southern	Inactive	
San Antonio	December 10, 1960	San Antonio, Texas	Western	Active	
San Bernardino Valley	May 4, 1979	San Bernardino, California	Western	Active	
San Diego	September 1957	San Diego, California	Western	Active	
San Fernando Valley	May 5, 1973	Encino, Los Angeles, California	Western	Active	
San Francisco	September 23, 1950	San Francisco, California	Western	Active	
San Jose	June 6, 1981	San Jose, California	Western	Active	
Savannah	November 3, 1956	Savannah, Georgia	Southern	Active	
Selma		Selma, Alabama	Southern	Active	
Shelby County	February 23, 1985	Memphis, Tennessee	Central	Active	(Note: Chapter formed from R.A.R.E. (Radiating Attitudes of Resourceful Efforts), established on February 16, 1983, as an interest group for The Links.)
Shreveport	April 15, 1973	Shreveport, Louisiana	Southern	Active	
Silver Spring	November 1972	Silver Spring, Maryland	Eastern	Active	
Solano County	January 29, 1994	Vallejo, California	Western	Active	
South Bend	April 21, 1990	South Bend, Indiana	Central	Active	
South Jersey	1967	Voorhees, New Jersey	Eastern	Active	
South Suburban	June 5, 1976	Matteson, Illinois	Central	Active	
Southern Chain	May 15, 1982	Bryans Road, Maryland	Eastern	Active	
Southern Metroplex	May 1, 2022	Red Oak, Texas	Western	Active	
Spartanburg	September 27, 1975	Spartanburg, South Carolina	Southern	Active	
Spokane	May 27, 1978	Spokane, Washington	Western	Active	
Springfield		Springfield, Ohio	Central	Active	
Stockton	1966	Stockton, California	Western	Active	
Suffolk	October 12, 1985	Suffolk, Virginia	Eastern	Active	
Syracuse	1967	Syracuse, New York	Eastern	Active	
Tacoma	October 19, 1966	Tacoma, Washington	Western	Active	
Tallahassee	May 19, 1951	Tallahassee, Florida	Southern	Active	
Tampa	June 26, 1987	Tampa, Florida	Southern	Active	
Texas Spring Cypress	March 11, 1995	Cypress, Texas	Western	Active	
Toledo	October 21, 1972	Toledo, Ohio	Central	Active	
Topeka	November 1958	Topeka, Kansas	Central	Active	
Town Lake	April 30, 1988	Austin, Texas	Western	Active	
Treasure Coast	October 30, 1976	Port St. Lucie, Florida	Southern	Active	(Note: The chapter was chartered as the Fort Pierce chapter but was changed to the Treasure Coast on December 5, 2012.)
Tri-Cities	May 9, 1981	Richland, Washington	Western	Active	
Tri-City		Saginaw, Michigan	Central	Active	
Tri-County	June 12, 2010	Birmingham, Alabama	Southern	Active	(Note: This chapter serves Jefferson County, Shelby County, and St. Clair County, Alabama.)
Triangle Park	June 9, 1984	Morrisville, North Carolina	Southern	Active	
Trinity	May 14, 1994	Dallas, Texas	Western	Active	
Tucson	1962	Tucson, Arizona	Western	Active	
Tulsa	December 5, 1964	Tulsa, Oklahoma	Central	Active	(Note: Chapter formed from the Pals Club, established in 1961 to become a chapter of The Links.)
Tuscaloosa	April 17, 1993	Tuscaloosa, Alabama	Southern	Active	
Tuskegee	January 4, 1962	Tuskegee, Alabama	Southern	Active	
Twin Rivers	February 2, 1988	Columbus, Ohio	Central	Active	
Waco Central	May 25, 1974	Waco, Texas	Western	Active	
Washington, D.C.	April 1948	Washington, D.C.	Eastern	Active	
Waterbury	May 1975	Waterbury, Connecticut	Eastern	Active	
West Georgia	November 11, 2020	Douglasville, Georgia	Southern	Colony	(Note: The chapter includes Douglas, Carroll, Coweta, and Paulding counties of Georgia.)
West Palm Beach	February 8, 1969	West Palm Beach, Florida	Southern	Active	
West Towns	1976	Oak Brook, Illinois	Central	Active	
Westchester County	June 10, 1950	White Plains, New York	Eastern	Active	
Western Reserve	1987	Shaker Heights, Ohio	Central	Active	
Wichita	December 7, 1968	Wichita, Kansas	Central	Active	
Wilberforce		Wilberforce, Ohio	Central	Active	
Willow Oak		Prince George's County, Maryland	Eastern	Active	
Wilmington (DE)	April 10, 1948	Wilmington, Delaware	Eastern	Active	
Wilmington (NC)	April 1951	Wilmington, North Carolina	Southern	Active	
Wilson-Rocky Mount-Tarboro	April 19, 1948	Rocky Mount, North Carolina	Southern	Active	
Windy City	May 2, 1987	Chicago, Illinois	Central	Active	(Note: Chapter formed from the Windy City Women's League, established in July 1984.)
Winston-Salem	March 23, 1950	Winston-Salem, North Carolina	Southern	Active	
Youngstown	October 17, 1955	Youngstown, Ohio	Central	Active	

== See also ==
- List of The Links members
