= Nowlin =

Nowlin is a surname. Notable people with the surname include:

- Abner W. C. Nowlin (1833–1906), American politician
- Eugenia Campbell Nowlin (1908–2003), American artist, arts administrator
- James Robertson Nowlin (born 1937), American judge
- Kiara Nowlin, American gymnast
- Stephen Nowlin, American artist
- T. S. Nowlin, American screenwriter
