= Evgenia =

Evgenia, Evgeniya, Yevgenia or Yevgeniya is a feminine given name which may refer to:

== Evgenia, Evgeniya or Evyenia ==
- Evgeniya Augustinas (born 1988), Russian racing cyclist
- Evgeniya Belyakova (born 1986), Russian basketball player in the Women's National Basketball Association
- Evgeniya Brik (1981–2021), Russian actress
- Evgenia Chernyshyova, former Soviet pairs figure skater
- Evgeniya Doluhanova (born 1984), Ukrainian chess grandmaster
- Evgenia Filonenko (born 1982), retired Ukrainian pair skater
- Evgeniya Ivanova (Russian water polo) (born 1987)
- Evgeniya Kanayeva (born 1990), Russian individual rhythmic gymnast
- Evgeniya Kosetskaya (born 1994), Russian badminton player
- Evgenia Koutsoudi (born 1984), Greek synchronized swimmer
- Evgeniya Kryukova (born 1971), Soviet and Russian film and theater actress
- Evgeniya Kuznetsova (born 1980), former Olympic gymnast for Russia and later Bulgaria
- Evgenia Linetskaya (born 1986), Russian-born Israeli tennis player
- Evgenia Medvedeva (born 1999), Russian ladies figure skater
- Evgenia Melnik (born 1988), Belarusian figure skater
- Evgenia Obraztsova (born 1984), Russian prima ballerina
- Evgenia Pavlina (born 1978), Belarusian individual rhythmic gymnast
- Evgeniya Pavlova (born 1993), Russian biathlete
- Evgenia Radanova (born 1977), Bulgarian female sportsperson
- Evgeniya Rodina (born 1989), Russian tennis player
- Evgeniya Shakhovskaya (1889–1920), Russian noblewoman who was the first female military pilot
- Evgenia Shelgunova (born 1997), Russian artistic gymnast
- Evgenia Shishkova (1972–2025), professional pairs figure skater and coach
- Evgenia Tarasova (born 1994), Russian pairs figure skater
- Evgenia Tur (1815–1892), Russian writer
- Evgenia Vlasova (born 1978), Ukrainian singer
- Evgenia Zabolotskaya, Russian-American acoustic engineer
- Evgeniya Zakharova (born 1994), Russian short track speed skater
- Evyenia "Evy" Poumpouras (born 1977), a Greek American journalist and author

== Yevgenia or Yevgeniya ==
- Yevgenia Albats (born 1958), Russian investigative journalist, political scientist, writer and radio host
- Yevgenia Alissova-Klobukova (1889–1962), Russian botanist
- Yevgenia Bosch (1879–1925), Bolshevik activist, politician and acting leader of the provisional Soviet government of Ukraine in 1917
- Yevgenia Bugoslavskaya (1899–1960), Soviet astronomer
- Yevgeniya Chirikova (born 1976), Russian environmental activist
- Yevgenia Dobrovolskaya (born 1964), Russian actress
- Yevgeniya Dolinyuk (1914–1990), Ukrainian kolkhoznik, politician and writer
- Yevgenia Ginzburg (1904–1977), Russian historian and writer
- Yevgenia Pobedimova (1898–1973), Russian-Soviet botanist and plant collector
- Yevgeniya Rudneva (1920–1944), Soviet (Ukrainian) World War II female combat pilot
- Yevgenia Savranska (born 1984), Israeli-Ukrainian retired tennis player
- Yevgeniya Yermakova (born 1976), retired freestyle swimmer from Kazakhstan

== Yevheniia/Yevheniya ==
Ukrainian derivatives of this first name, some notable people with this name are :

- Yevheniia Kantemyr (born 2005), Ukrainian badminton player
- Yevheniia Kucherenko (1922-2020), Soviet-Ukrainian Pedagogue
- Yevheniia Kravchuk (born 1985), Ukrainian politician
- Yevheniia Breus (born 1982), Ukrainian para-fencer
- Yevheniya Prokofyeva (born 1995), Ukrainian long-distance runner
- Yevheniya Dovhodko (born 1992), Ukrainian rower
- Yevhenia Kuznietsova (born 1987), Ukrainian author

== Nicknames ==
This name is often shortened to Zhenya as an affectionate nickname.

== See also ==
- Eugenia (given name)
