= Eugene =

Eugene may refer to:

== People and fictional characters ==
- Eugene (given name), including a list of people and fictional characters with the given name
- Gene Eugene, stage name of Canadian born actor, record producer, engineer, composer and musician Gene Andrusco (1961–2000)
- Eugene (wrestler), professional wrestler Nick Dinsmore
- Eugene (actress) (born 1981), Kim Yoo-jin, South Korean actress and former member of the singing group S.E.S.

== Places ==
=== Canada ===
- Mount Eugene, in Nunavut; the highest mountain of the United States Range on Ellesmere Island

=== United States ===
- Eugene, Oregon, a city
  - Eugene, OR Metropolitan Statistical Area
  - Eugene (Amtrak station)
- Eugene Apartments, NRHP-listed apartment complex in Portland, Oregon
- Eugene, Indiana, an unincorporated town
- Eugene, Missouri, an unincorporated town

== Business ==
- Eugene Green Energy Standard, or EUGENE, an international standard to which electricity labelling schemes can be accredited to confirm that they provide genuine environmental benefits
- Eugene Group, a Korean chaebol
- Eugen Systems, a gaming company located in France
- Eugene Textile Center, a fiber arts studio, retail outlet and educational center in Eugene, Oregon

== Literature ==
- The protagonist of Eugene Onegin, an 1833 novel in verse written by Aleksandr Pushkin
- Eugene trilogy, a collection of plays by Neil Simon

== Music ==
- the title character of Eugene Onegin (opera), an 1879 opera by Tchaikovsky
- Eugene (1989), an album by Anthony Braxton
- "Eugene" (song), by Arlo Parks, 2020
- "Eugene", a song from the 2006 album The Evening Call by Greg Brown
- "Eugene", a song from the 2015 album Carrie & Lowell by Sufjan Stevens

== Storms ==
- March 2017 North American blizzard, also known as Blizzard Eugene
- Hurricane Eugene, several storms

== Other uses ==
- Eugene Ballet, an American ballet company based in Eugene, Oregon
- USS Eugene (PF-40), a 1943 frigate

== See also ==
- HMS Prince Eugene (1915), a British monitor
- Saint Eugene (disambiguation)
- Eugenia (disambiguation)
