= Anita Lyons Bond =

American civil rights activist (1930–2025)

Anita Lyons Bond (July 6, 1930 – August 15, 2025) was an American civil rights activist and academic, who became the first black woman to graduate with honors from Saint Louis University.

Bond was an advocate for education, equality, and civil rights. She was a community leader and was elected in 1974 as the president of the St. Louis Board of Education. She lectured at many universities on Black Studies. She achieved national attention for her courses in speech correction and her strong advocacy of equal human rights. In 2015, she was awarded an honorary PhD in humanities by Saint Louis University. She was a member of The Links.

Bond died on August 15, 2025, at the age of 95.
