= Eugenijus =

- Gender: Male

Origin
- Origin: Eugen
- Meaning: "Noble", "well-born"
- Region of origin: Lithuania

Other names
- Related names: Eugenija

Eugenijus may refer to:

- Eugenijus Gentvilas (born 1960), Lithuanian politician
- Eugenijus Riabovas (born 1951), Lithuanian football manager
- Eugenijus Karpavičius (1953–2010), Lithuanian illustrator
- Eugenijus Maldeikis (born 1958), Lithuanian politician
- Eugenijus Petrovas (born 1936), Lithuanian politician
- Eugenijus Jovaiša, Lithuanian historian and politician
- Eugenijus Kazimieras Jovaiša (born 1940), Lithuanian fashion artist
- Eugenijus Mindaugas Budrys (1925–2007), Lithuanian painter
