= Annette March-Grier =

American nonprofit administrator

- Education: University of Delaware (BSN); Community College of Baltimore County (Mortuary Science)
- Occupations: Registered nurse, licensed mortician, nonprofit executive
- Employer: Roberta's House Inc.
- Known for: Founder and president of Roberta's House
- Parent(s): William C. March and Julia R. March
- Awards: Maryland Top 100 Women Award (2014); Governor's Victim Assistance Award (2014)

Annette March-Grier is the president of the Roberta's House Inc., a nonprofit grief support center for children and adults in Baltimore, MD. Her career path includes being a registered nurse and a licensed mortician. Her family owns the largest African American funeral service provider in the United States founded by her parents William C. March and Julia R. March. She attended the University of Delaware School of Nursing, followed by working at the Johns Hopkins Hospital for 3 years and the Visiting Nurse Association of Baltimore for 8 years.

== Education ==
In 1982, Annette graduated from the University of Delaware School of Nursing. She then went on and worked at the Johns Hopkins Hospital for three years, while at the same time working at the Visiting Nurse Association of Baltimore for eight years. In 1985, she went back home to work for her family business. During this time, she was studying at the Community College of Baltimore County where she got her degree in mortuary science and became a licensed mortician.

== Career ==
Annette March-Grier's organization (Roberta's House) helps kids, adults, and families in Baltimore who suffer from all sorts of trauma. With background of growing up in her parents' funeral home, she has seen how grief can affect families. She has started Roberta's House which is now split up into seven different programs. Volunteer training, mental health professionals, and educational workshops are all there to help those suffering loss. As a result, Annette's programs have been able to help thousands of grieving people in the Baltimore area.

- Member, Former V.P., Harbor City Chapter of the Links Inc.
- Member of Association of Death Educators & Counselors
- Member, Former President of Parish Counsel, St. Ann Catholic Church
- Member National Funeral Directors Association
- Member American Cemetery Association
- Former Trustee, Board Member, Sheppard Pratt Health System

== Achievements ==
- Former Member of the Guidance Advisory Committee for Baltimore City Schools
- Former Second Vice President, Maryland State Board of Morticians
- Former Advisory Board Member of the Family Bereavement Center of Baltimore Maryland
- Greater Baltimore Committee Leadership Class of 2014
- Certified as a Funeral Service Practitioner (CFSP) by the Academy of Professional Funeral Services in 2001

== Awards ==
- The Daily Record's 2014 Maryland Top 100 Women Award, 5/2014
- Reginald F. Lewis Museum Community Award 2014
- Governor's Victim Assistance Award 2014 for outstanding contributions to the field of victim services
- Bethel AME, Fannie Coppin Community Empowerment Award 5/12/2014
- Coppin State University, Nonprofit Leadership Alliance Award, 5/2011
- 100 Black Women in Funeral Service Award for Education Program of the Year-Aftercare Program Providing Hope & Healing for Grieving Families- 2011-12
