= Eugenius (disambiguation) =

Eugenius (died 394) was a 4th-century Roman emperor.

Eugenius may also refer to:

== People ==
- Eugenius (Antioch), a Roman usurper, during the rule of Diocletian
- Eugenius, a Coptic saint – see Eugenius, Eugander, and Abilandius
- Eugenius, character in Laurence Sterne's novel The Life and Opinions of Tristram Shandy, Gentleman
- Eugene of Palermo, Sicilian admiral
- Eugenius of Carthage, canonised bishop of Carthage
- Eugenius I of Byzantium, Bishop of Byzantium from 237 to 242
- Mar Awgin (Mar Eugenios) (died 363), Egyptian monk and presumed founder of Syriac monasticism
- Eugenius I of Toledo (died 647), Archbishop of Toledo from 636 to 647
- Eugenius II of Toledo (died 657), Archbishop of Toledo from 647 to 657
- Owain ap Dyfnwal (fl. 934), King of the Cumbrians
- Owain ap Dyfnwal (died 1015), King of the Cumbrians
- Owain Foel (fl. 1018), King of the Cumbrians
- Patriarch Eugenius II of Constantinople (1780–1822), Patriarch of Constantinople from 1821 to 1822
- Eugenius Roche (1786–1829), Anglo-French journalist and poet
- Eugenius Birch (1818–1884), English architect
- Eugenius Warming (1841–1924), Danish botanist

=== Popes ===
Four popes have been named Eugenius:

- Pope Eugenius I (654–657)
- Pope Eugenius II (824-827)
- Pope Eugenius III (1145–1153)
- Pope Eugenius IV (1431–1447)

== Other uses ==
- Eugenius (band), a Scottish rock band
- Eugenius!, a musical

== See also ==
- Eugenia (disambiguation)
- Eugene (disambiguation)
