= Eugenija =

- Gender: Female

Origin
- Origin: Eugenia
- Meaning: "noble", "well-born"
- Region of origin: Lithuania

Other names
- Related names: Eugenijus

Eugenija is a given name. Notable people with the name include:

- Eugenija Pleškytė (1938–2012), Lithuanian actress
- Lilija Eugenija Jasiūnaitė (born 1944), Lithuanian painter and textile artist
