= Eugenia Popescu-Județ =

Romanian musicologist, choreographer and ethnomusicologist (1925-2011)

- Born: Eugenia Marisescu; September 19, 1925; Giurgiu, Kingdom of Romania
- Died: December 20, 2011 (aged 86); Pittsburgh, Pennsylvania, United States
- Other name: Eugenia Popescu-Judetz
- Spouse: Gheorghe Popescu-Județ (m. 1948; died 1972)

Academic background
- Education: University of Pittsburgh

Academic work
- Institutions: Duquesne University
- Main interests: Romanian folk dance Dimitrie Cantemir

Eugenia Popescu-Județ (also spelled Popescu-Judetz; September 19, 1925 – December 20, 2011) was a Romanian dancer, dance teacher, choreographer, and folklorist. Trained in ballet, she performed as a solo dancer for several professional theatres in Bucharest and became a famed choreographer of folk-inspired character dance working for film, TV, and several professional ensembles in Romania. She taught folk dance in Romania and internationally. Later she became an expert in manuscripts relating to the 17th century Romanian prince and composer Dimitrie Cantemir.

== Life and work ==
Eugenia Popescu-Județ, née Marisescu, was born in Giurgiu, Romania on September 19, 1925. Trained since childhood in classical ballet, she became a professional dancer and solo ballerina with the National Theatre Ballet of Bucharest (1945–50) and the National Opera, also in Bucharest (1950–54). After her marriage to the dancer Gheorghe Popescu-Județ in 1948, her interest in Romanian folk dance increased. Together they performed folk dance-inspired choreographies and they won the first prize for character dance in the International Dance Competition at Prague in 1950. From 1954 to 1970 she was ballet master and choreographer for the Perinița ensemble in Bucharest. In this time, she also worked as a guest choreographer for several other Romanian ensembles. From 1968 to 1970 she directed and choreographed folk dance-inspired dance films for Romanian Television.

Eugenia Popescu-Județ taught dance in various capacities, for example from 1948 to 1950 as a folk dance teacher and choreographer at the School and Ensemble of Pioneers in Bucharest, at the High School of the Arts in Bucharest, and later in the United States.

Eugenia also had a career as a researcher and scholar. From 1949 to 1951, she worked as a researcher at the Folklore Institute in Bucharest (then Institut de Folclor, today Institutul de Etnografie și Folclor "Constantin Brăiloiu"). From 1949 into the 1960s, she frequently accompanied her husband on research trips in the field to study Romanian folk dance.

At a time when international travels were a rare privilege for Romanians, Eugenia Popescu-Județ frequently travelled as a guest lecturer and dance instructor: to India (1969), Yugoslavia (1969), Lebanon (1969), the United States (1970), Belgium (1970–71), and Finland (1971).

After her husband died in 1972, Eugenia permanently moved to the United States in 1973. In the US she taught at Duquesne University in Pittsburgh, Pennsylvania. Subsequently, she became an adjunct professor at Duquesne and continued to teach and choreograph for their dance ensemble The Tamburitzans (collection guide). In the US, she received several advanced university degrees, including a Ph.D. from the University of Pittsburgh, and published several books and articles, some of which are concerned with Dimitrie Cantemir and Turkish music.

Between 1990 and 1995, Eugenia donated Gheorghe's and her own collection to the American Folklife Center at the Library of Congress, Washington, D.C.

== Death ==
Eugenia Popescu-Județ died on December 20, 2011, in Pittsburgh, Pennsylvania.

== Selected publications ==
Popescu Județ, Eugenia

- 1973. Dimitrie Cantemir: Cartea științei muzicii (Dimitrie Cantemir: The book of the science of music). Editura Muzicală a Uniunii Compozitorilor: Bucharest.
- 1979. Sixty Folk Dances of Romania. Duquesne University Tamburitzans, Institute of Folk Arts: Pittsburgh, PA.
- 1993. Disemic features in the Romanian folk musical "Jienii". Dance studies. vol. 17, pp. 77–129.
- 1999. Prince Dimitrie Cantemir: theorist and composer of Turkish music. Pan: Beșiktaș, Istanbul
- 2002. Tanburî Küçük Artin. A musical treatise of the eighteenth century. Pan Yayıncılık: Beşiktaş, İstanbul
- 2007. Beyond the glory of the sultans: Cantemir's view of the Turks. Pan: Beșiktaș, Istanbul

Popescu-Județ, Gheorghe, Eugenia Popescu-Județ, and James Roncevic. 1979. Judetz folk dance notation. Pittsburgh, Pa. Duquesne University Tamburitzans.
