= Eugenia Nobel =

German communist and propagandist

Eugenia (Genia) Nobel (December 13, 1912 – August 7, 1999) was a communist and German Jew who fled to Shanghai during the Second World War. In Shanghai, she produced news programming and anti-Fascist propaganda for the Soviet TASS radio station. She was also a leading organizer of the Association of Democratic Germans in Shanghai, which helped around 500 Germans to repatriate in 1947. In East Germany, she was an expert for international relations, particularly with China, and she authored important policy articles. Throughout her life, she worked as a writer, editor, and translator.

== Early life ==
Genia Nobel was born in 1912 in Moscow and raised in Berlin. She studied law and economics in Berlin, and she met her future husband Günter, who was also Jewish, at university. The two had to break off their studies due to Nazi persecution in 1933. Radicalized, they joined the German Communist Party, the KPD. After that, Nobel worked as a stenographer and typist. Nobel was arrested for the first time in 1934 for distributing the illegal newspaper Die Rote Fahne. Günter and Genia married that year. They were arrested together in July 1936 for distributing propaganda then released in 1939 on the condition that they emigrate immediately. The two were able to travel to Shanghai using the last of Genia Nobel's savings. Shanghai's unique lack of visa regulations meant that it was a "port of last resort" for those like the Nobels who needed to emigrate but had little money and no international connections. This was due to Shanghai's longtime status as a treaty port, established when China signed the Treaty of Nanjing with the British in 1842.

== Shanghai ==
The Nobles were among 18,000 Jewish refugees who entered Shanghai in the late 1930s, part of the 175 million people displaced worldwide during the Second World War. Just before their arrival, the Japanese invasion had resulted in particularly intensive fighting in Shanghai in late 1937. In the second half of 1937, a massive wave of refugees had fled the fighting in eastern China. By 1938, tens of millions of Chinese civilians were displaced by the advancing Japanese. Thus, the Nobels entered a Shanghai that was damaged by war and overwhelmed by displaced people. During their first years in Shanghai, Nobels lived in Hongkou, a poor part of eastern Shanghai. Like most of the other refugees, they had little money and frequently suffered from health problems related to their poor living conditions and new environment. Still, refugees like the Nobels often lived in better conditions than Chinese refugees. Historian Marcia Ristaino writes of the European refugee population: "There was little to compare with the condition of the tens of thousands of wartime Chinese refugees crowded into makeshift housing or living in public streets or alleyways without adequate food or water."

Genia Nobel worked for a variety of employers during her time in Shanghai, including the U.S. Army. She worked as a translator, typist, and secretary, earning more than her husband Günter. Günter also did work for the U.S. Army, as a mechanic servicing vehicles.

== Communism/TASS ==
Following their arrival in Shanghai, they joined a communist group led by Johannes König (later East Germany's first ambassador to the PRC). At the time, they were not officially a KPD group because they had no contact with the KPD's then-scattered leadership, but their work was retroactively recognized, allowing them to claim uninterrupted party membership. The group was important for their later professional trajectory in Germany; keeping up with the latest changes in Soviet ideology during the war was critical for success as a cadre in the postwar Soviet Zone. The group carried out study sessions and distributed propaganda materials. Between September 1941 and 1947, Genia Nobel was among the group members who carried out the German-language programming for the Soviet TASS radio station XRVN. She worked directly in the TASS office, creating a fifteen-minute news program each day, which she edited and translated. In 1943, the German refugees were the first broadcasters in Shanghai to report the fall of Mussolini. Most Jews in Shanghai were not communists, and Nobel's activities alienated her and her fellow group members from the larger body of refugees. The activities of the group were illegal, both during their time under the Nationalists and the Japanese. The Soviets were allowed to operate their radio station until the Japanese restricted its activities then shut it down entirely in 1944.

== The Shanghai Ghetto ==
In late 1943, the Nobels were forced into a Japanese-administered ghetto for "stateless nationals," also in Hongkou. In November 1941, the Reich had passed a law stripping Jews abroad of their nationality, which left the Shanghai Jews stateless, and it was this criterion that the Japanese used to force Jews into the ghetto while leaving other Germans free. The Shanghai ghetto differed significantly from World-War-Two-era ghettos in Europe. Refugees could obtain passes to leave each day to go to work, and many Chinese continued to live in the ghetto area. Genia and Günter Nobel recalled cramped and overcrowded living spaces and "the worst of material conditions. Epidemics like typhoid, dysentery, tuberculosis, and meningitis laid waste to the generally malnourished people, claiming many victims." The Japanese imposed harsh and arbitrary entrance and exit conditions. When Japan capitulated in 1945, the Shanghai Ghetto was liberated by the Americans. Genia Nobel recalled that material conditions improved at this time, there were a greater number of work opportunities, and it became easier for her KPD group to meet.

Association of Democratic Germans in Shanghai

After Japan's surrender, Shanghai's stateless refugees faced a further dilemma of how to leave China. It was the task of the United Nations Relief and Rehabilitation Administration (UNRRA) to channel this postwar wave of displacement. Though most scholarship on UNRRA has focused on its European operations, China received the most aid of any country in the project. UNRRA estimated it provided relief to somewhat more than one million internally displaced people there, so relief provided to European refugees such as the Nobels constituted only a small fraction of its work in China.

Refugees who were categorized as displaced persons, or DPs, could receive UNRRA assistance; they included persecutees (victims of the Axis powers) and displaced people from Allied countries. In 1945, Nobel took a leading role in founding and operating an advocacy group called Gemeinschaft der demokratischen Deutschen in Schanghai (Association of Democratic Germans in Shanghai) to help all non-fascist refugees who wanted to return home to Germany. It was recognized as the official body of refugees wishing to return to Germany and took on administrative tasks to organize their return. The Association successfully lobbied UNRRA to assign ghetto residents DP status. The stateless refugees of Shanghai fell into the "persecutee" category.

On July 25, 1947, the refugees, including the Nobels, boarded the Marine Lynx, an American troop transport vessel. They disembarked in Naples and continued their journeys by rail. Around 500 returned to Germany and 144 to Austria.

== East Germany ==
Just before the Nobel's arrival in Germany, the KPD had been forcibly merged with the center-left SPD in the Soviet Zone to form the new Socialist Unity Party (SED), which would become the ruling party of East Germany. As communists, the Nobels wanted to contribute to building socialism in Germany. Like many like-minded returnees, they reported to SED's Berlin headquarters in search of work. However, because their return had been delayed by years, the Shanghai returnees found that the most desirable and important positions in the SED had already been filled.

Genia first worked for the Berlin City Council, then as an editor for Neues Deutschland, the official party newspaper of the SED. She later took on an important position as a contributing editor at the journal Einheit, which was the premier venue for presenting SED policy and ideology. Günter was hired by a friend at the SED's state representative committee (Landesvorstand), in the commerce and industry division (Sektion Wirtschaft).

During the late 1940s and early 1950s, the Eastern Bloc was gripped by growing Stalinist paranoia about traitors and spies. People who had spent time in capitalist countries were branded "West émigrés" and were suspected of "cosmopolitanism." Jews were considered especially suspect. Having spent time in China, ironically, made one a "West émigré" because under the Nationalists and the Japanese, it was a capitalist country. When the Nobels returned to East Germany, they didn't hide their work for the U.S. Army in Shanghai because they didn't think it would hurt them and many people knew about it anyway. Günter's "Inspection as a West Émigré" ("Überprüfung als Westemigrant") began in 1949. He was interrogated on 29 January 1953 when his file was worked through in the course of an anti-Semitic Stalinist campaign that swept through Eastern Europe. The questions asked during his interrogation reveal how little the SED understood about the situation of Jews under the Nazis and about the Nobels' emigration to Shanghai. For example, Günter was asked on whose orders he emigrated, why he went to Shanghai, and why he did not stay and fight. In other words, his interrogators were unaware that emigration was ordered by the Nazi state and that Shanghai was the only possible destination. Genia Nobel did not publish anything about her refugee experience until decades later, and it seems her colleagues in the SED would have known little about her experiences.

After his investigation Günter Nobel was transferred to cultural work. He also entered the diplomatic service and was head of the GDR's trade delegation to Sweden. This was a demotion away from more important and sensitive domestic work. Genia's position at Einheit was also placed under review, but she wasn't fired or demoted. This is strange because she was clearly exposed to more capitalist "ideological contamination" as a secretary for the U.S. Army than her husband working as a mechanic for them. Nonetheless, she survived and even thrived professionally during the decades that followed, authoring important articles and essays that often had an international focus.

Throughout the GDR's existence, Genia Nobel's professional priorities in East Germany meant that her engagement with China vacillated with the GDR-PRC relationship. For example, during a period of relatively warm relations in 1957, she published an article in Einheit defending the PRC's Anti-Rightist Campaign while admitting that it was controversial. Sino-Soviet relations declined in the late 1950s, resulting in a rupture in the international communist movement in 1960. PRC relations with the rest of the Eastern Bloc declined after that. Reflecting the shift, Nobel co-authored a 1964 article accusing the PRC of "great-power chauvinism," an accusation the CCP frequently lobbed at the U.S.S.R. Mao Zedong's death in 1976 ushered in a period of ambiguity following years of hostile GDR-PRC relations, and it was during this time that Nobel broke her quarter-century-long silence on her experience as a refugee, which previously had been politically dangerous to discuss. Between 1976 and 1979, she co-authored two short texts about her time in Shanghai. However, these texts focus entirely on anti-fascist resistance and make little reference to Chinese politics or culture, probably reflecting the fact that writing about China was still politically risky. For the first time, anti-Zionism also became an important value-signaling device in the Nobels' narrative: they accused the other Shanghai refugees of developing "Zionist tendencies," and wrote that there had been "Zionist-Fascist organizations" in Shanghai. This reflected the intense anti-Israel sentiment prevalent in the SED in the late 1970s.

The historian Chen Jian has noted that "the 'reform and opening' process meant that China would no longer behave as a revolutionary country internationally. This change, in turn, symbolized the beginning of a critical transition in China's evolution from an outsider to an insider in the existing international system." This transition paved the way for warmer GDR-PRC relations, and by the late 1980s, Nobel was involved with organizations such as the Freundschaftskomittee DDR-China and the China research department of the SED Central Committee's Institut für Internationale Arbeiterbewegung.

== After 1989 ==
In the post-1989 period, the Nobels and many other Shanghai returnees were also the focus of several museum exhibitions in Germany. They gave interviews to journalists and researchers about their time in Shanghai. Their story resonated with new concerns about Holocaust remembrance, participatory citizenship, and civil courage in reunited Germany; gone was any reference to anti-Zionism. Ursula Krechel's 2008 novel Shanghai fern von wo dramatized their experience.

Genia Nobel died on August 7, 1999, at the age of 86.

== Bibliography ==
- Anderson, Edith. Love in Exile: An American Writer's Memoir of Life in Divided Berlin. South Royalton, VT: Steerforth Press, 1999.
- Armbrüster, Georg, Michael Kohlstruck, and Sonja Mühlberger. "Exil Shanghai: Facetten eines Themas." In Exil Shanghai 1938-1947: jüdisches Leben in der Emigration, 12–19. Teetz: Hentrich & Hentrich, 2000.
- Middell, Eike. Exil in den USA, mit einem Bericht "Schanghai—Eine Emigration am Rande." Leipzig: Philipp Reclam, 1979.
- Freyeisen, Astrid. Shanghai und die Politik des Dritten Reiches. Würzburg: Königshausen & Neumann, 2000.
- Gardet, Claudie. Les Relations de La République Populaire de Chine et de La République Démocratique Allemande (1949-1989). Bern: Lang, 2000.
- Gatrell, Peter. The Making of the Modern Refugee. Oxford: Oxford University Press, 2013.
- Herf, Jeffrey. Divided Memory: The Nazi Past in the Two Germanys. Cambridge: Harvard Univ. Press, 1997.
- Holian, Anna. Between National Socialism and Soviet Communism: Displaced Persons in Postwar Germany. Ann Arbor: University of Michigan Press, 2011.
- Hoss, Christiane. "Kein sorgenfreies Leben: Erfahrungen mit dem neuen Deutschland," In Barzel, Amnon, ed. Leben im Wartesaal: Exil in Shanghai, 1938-1947, 100–122. Berlin: Jüdisches Museum im Stadtmuseum Berlin, 1997.
- Jian, Chen. "China and the Cold War after Mao." In Melvyn P. Leffler and Odd Arne Westad eds, The Cambridge History of the Cold War, 181–200. Cambridge: Cambridge University Press, 2010.
- Kirsch, Sarah. "Nach Shanghai und zurück: Aus dem Leben der Genossin Genia Nobel, nacherzählt von Sarah Kirsch." In Alice Uszkoreit ed. Bekanntschaften. Eine Anthologie, 5–24. Berlin: Aufbau Verlag, 1976.
- Kranzler, David. "Japanese, Nazis & Jews: The History of the Jewish Refugee Community of Shanghai, 1938–1945." 1971.
- Krechel, Ursula. Shanghai fern von wo. Salzburg: Jung und Jung, 2008.
- Krisch, Henry. German Politics under Soviet Occupation. New York: Columbia University Press, 1974.
- Raphael, Kurt. "Hier Spricht Der Sender XRVN: Deutsche Antifaschisten Am Mikrofon Im Fernen Osten." Presse Der Sowjetunion (A), September 9, 1966.
- Lary, Diana. The Chinese People at War: Human Suffering and Social Transformation, 1937-1945. New York: Cambridge University Press, 2010.
- Marrus, Michael Robert. The Unwanted: European Refugees in the Twentieth Century. New York: Oxford University Press, 1985.
- Mitter, Rana. Forgotten Ally: China's World War II, 1937-1945. Boston: Houghton Mifflin Harcourt, 2013.
- Mitter, Rana. "Imperialism, Transnationalism, and the Reconstruction of Post-War China: UNRRA in China, 1944-7." Past & Present 218, suppl. 8 (January 1, 2013): 51–69.
- Nobel, Genia and Nobel, Günter. "Als politische Emigranten in Shanghai." Beiträge zur Geschichte der Arbeiterbewegung, no. 6 (1979): 882–94.
- Nobel, Genia. "Die Abfuhr für die rechten Elemente und die große Diskussion über den sozialistischen Aufbau in China." Einheit, no. 11 (1957): 1444–52.
- Nobel, Genia and Becker, Georg. "Gegen Eine Politik Des Großmachtchauvinismus." Einheit, no. Sept./Oct. (1964): 165–76.
- Reinisch, Jessica. "'Auntie UNRRA' at the Crossroads." Past & Present Supplement 8 (2013): 70–97.
- Reinisch, Jessica. "Internationalism in Relief: The Birth (and Death) of UNRRA." Past & Present, no. Supplement 6 (2011): 258–89.
- Reinisch, Jessica. "Relief in the Aftermath of War." Journal of Contemporary History 43, no. 3 (July 2008): 371–404.
- Ristaino, Marcia. Port of Last Resort: The Diaspora Communities of Shanghai. Stanford: Stanford University Press, 2001.
- Schoppa, R. Keith. In a Sea of Bitterness: Refugees during the Sino-Japanese War. Cambridge, MA: Harvard University Press, 2011.
- Shephard, Ben. "`Becoming Planning Minded': The Theory and Practice of Relief 1940—1945." Journal of Contemporary History 43, no. 3 (July 2008): 405–19.
- Shephard, Ben. The Long Road Home: The Aftermath of the Second World War. New York: Anchor Books, 2012.
- Spence, Jonathan. The Search for Modern China. New York: Norton, 1990.
- Westad, Odd Arne, ed. Brothers in Arms: The Rise and Fall of the Sino-Soviet Alliance, 1945-1963. Stanford: Stanford University Press, 2011.
- Woodbridge, George. UNRRA: The History of the United Nations Relief and Rehabilitation Administration. Vol. II. New York: Columbia University Press, 1950.
