= Eugenia Chuprina =

Ukrainian poet (*1971)

Eugenia Volodymyrivna Chuprina Євгенія Володимирівна Чуприна
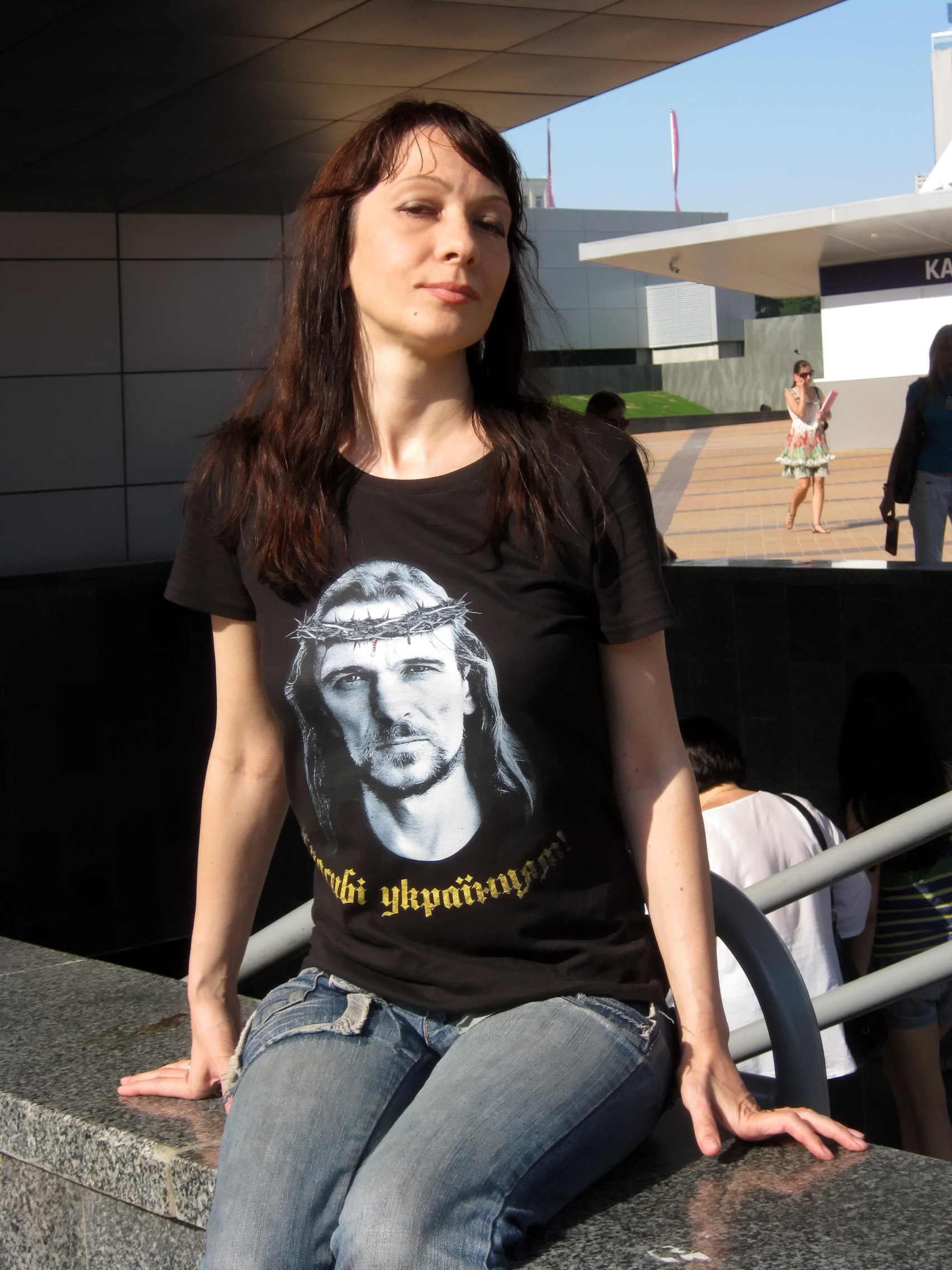
- Born: July 24, 1971 (age 55); Kiev, Ukrainian SSR, Soviet Union (now Kyiv, Ukraine)
- Education: Kyiv State University
- Occupations: poet; writer; playwright
- Writing career
- Pen name: Пані Друїдеса (Mrs. Druids)
- Notable work: Роман з Пельменем (Romance with Pelmen)
- Notable awards: Vladimir Korolenko Prize

Eugenia Volodymyrivna Chuprina (Ukrainian: Євгенія Володимирівна Чуприна; pen name, Пані Друїдеса (Mrs. Druids); born July 24, 1971) is a contemporary Ukrainian poet, writer, and playwright. She is the Chair of the Organizing Committee of the International Prize, Olesya Ulyanenko; member of the Ukrainian PEN; member of the National Union of Writers of Ukraine; and the National Union of Journalists She is the winner of the Vladimir Korolenko Prize. Chuprina is the author of poem collections, Твори (Works) (1997, 2000) and Вид знизу (Bottom view) (2002); prose Роман з Пельменем (Romance with Pelmen) (2000, 2002) and mashup novel, Орхидеи ещё не зацвели (Orchids have not yet bloomed) (2010).

== Biography ==
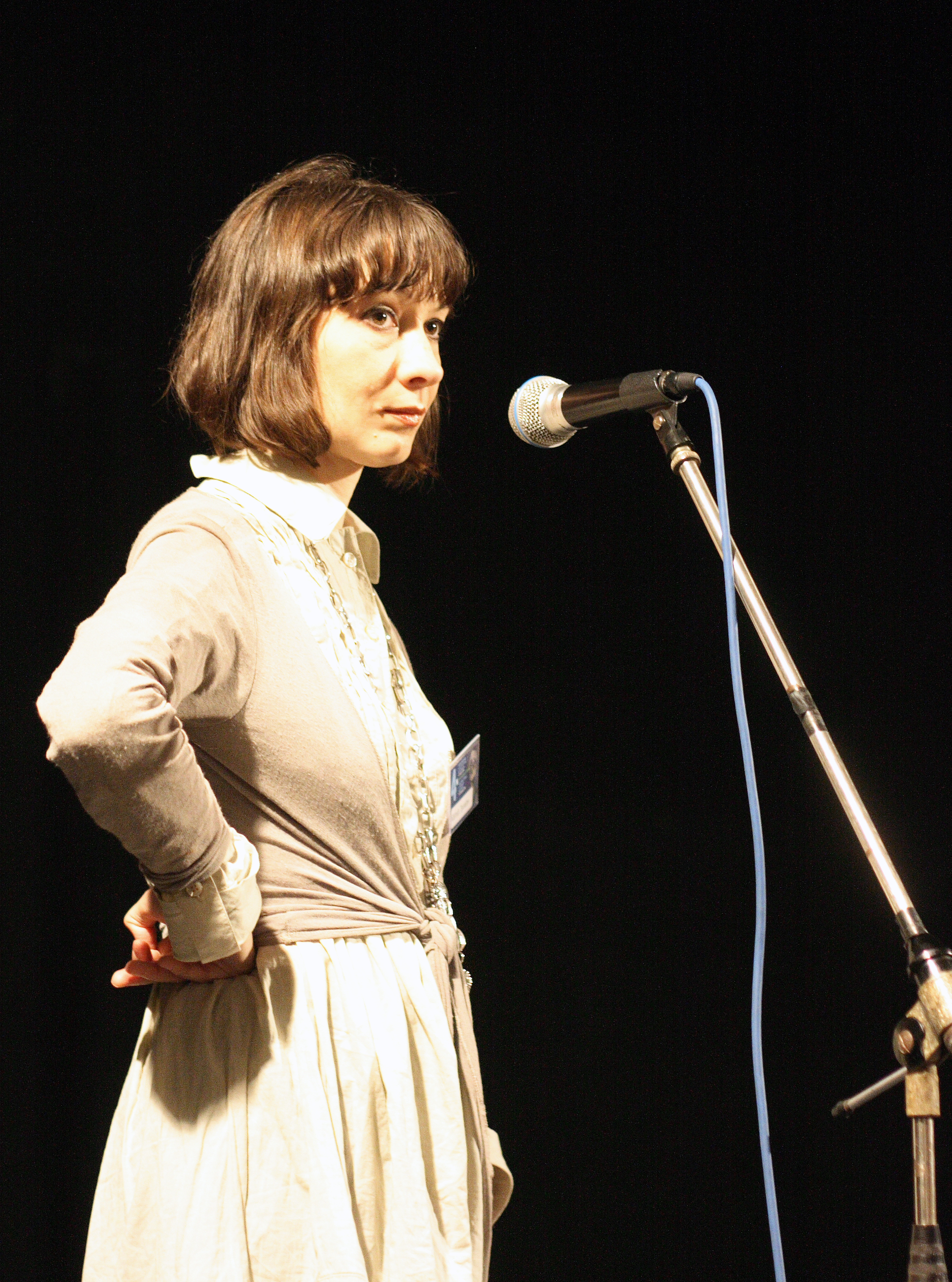
2009

Eugenia Volodymyrivna Chuprina was born July 24, 1971, in Kyiv. Chuprina studied at the Faculty of Philology of Kyiv State University.

She is the author of collections of poems Твори (Works) (1997, 2000) and Вид знизу (Bottom view) (2002), У хаті, де не працює санвузол (In the house where the bathroom does not work) (2016), У шубі на стиглому тілі (In a fur coat on a ripe body) (2017), and Великі форми (Large forms) (2019). Her prose work, Роман з Пельменем (Romance with Pelmen) (2000, 2002), became the first Russian-language internet bestseller.

Her works have been published in Coast, Philadelphia; Stalker, Los Angeles; magazines Нева, Saint Petersburg; Веселка, Kyiv; СТЫХ, Dnipropetrovsk; Радуга, Kyiv; Отражение, Donetsk; Фабула; Лава, Kharkiv; and elsewhere.

The play Цвєтаєва + Пастернак (Tsvetaeva + Pasternak) was staged at the modern theater Сузір'я, Kyiv. Opposing copyright, she refused to include copyright for her novel, Орхидеи еще не зацвели (Orchids have not yet bloomed), which she posted for free on the website "Сетевая словесность" (Network Literature), but a fuller version of this novel, which the author calls "adult", is available. Chuprina has written columns in EGO, XXL, Жіночому журналі (Women's magazine), and the newspaper 24. She worked as Deputy Editor-in-Chief of the men's magazine, XXL. She was a literary agent of the writer Oles Ulianenko until his death. She compiled the anthology, Мистецький Барбакан. Трикутник 92 (Artistic Barbican. Triangle 92).

== Awards ==
- Vladimir Korolenko Prize

== Selected works ==
=== Collections of poems ===
- Твори (1997, 2000)
- Вид знизу (2002)
- У шубі на стиглому тілі (2017)

=== Collections of verlibriums ===
- У хаті, де не працює санвузол (2016)

=== Novels ===
- Роман з Пельменем(2000, 2002)
- Орхидеи ещё не зацвели (2010)

== Personal life ==
Lives in Kyiv, husband is writer Alexey Nikitin.
