= Eugene Apartments =

Historic building in Portland, Oregon, U.S.

- U.S. National Register of Historic Places
- U.S. Historic district – Contributing property
- Portland Historic Landmark
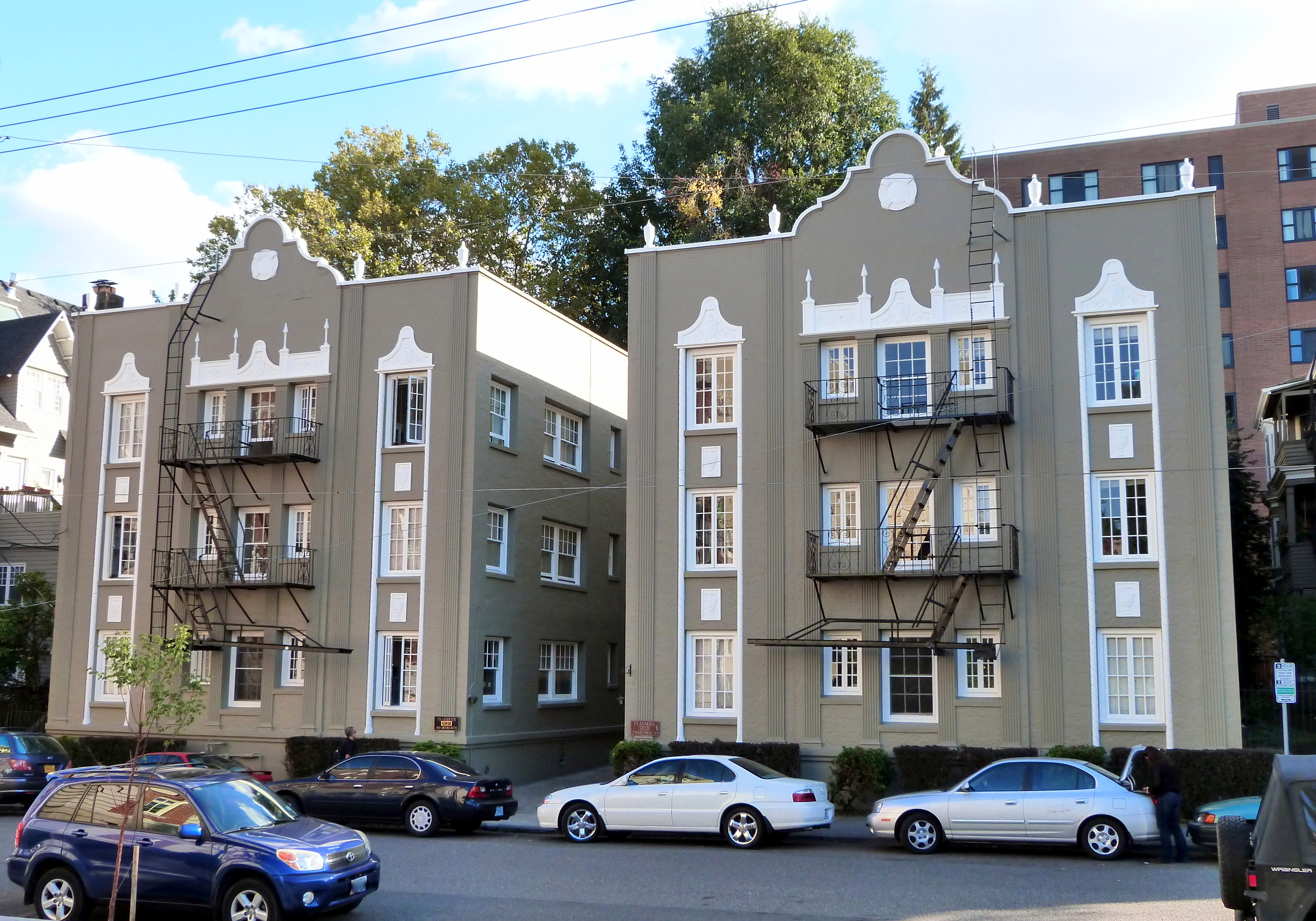
- The building's exterior in 2013

- Location within Portland, Oregon Location within Oregon Location within the United States
- Location: 2030 NW Flanders Street; Portland, Oregon
- Coordinates: 45°31′31″N 122°41′35″W
- Built: 1930
- Architect: Elmer Feig
- Architectural style: Mission/Spanish Revival, Modernistic
- Part of: Alphabet Historic District (ID00001293)
- NRHP reference No.: 94001023
- Added to NRHP: August 26, 1994

The Eugene Apartments is a building complex located in northwest Portland, Oregon listed on the National Register of Historic Places.

== See also ==
- National Register of Historic Places listings in Northwest Portland, Oregon
