= Saint Eugene =

Saint Eugene, Saint Eugenius or Saint-Eugène may refer to:

== Saints ==
- Pope Eugene I, Saint
- Eugenius of Carthage
- Eugenius II of Toledo
- Eugenios of Trebizond
- Saint Eugene of Derry
- Saint Eugene martyred by Huneric
- Saint Eugene, father of Marina the Monk
- Mar Awgin (Saint Eugenios)
- Eugène de Mazenod (1782–1861)

== Places ==
=== Canada ===
- Saint-Eugène, Quebec, a municipality in the administrative region of Centre-du-Québec
- Saint-Eugène-de-Guigues, Quebec, often referred to simply as Saint-Eugène
- Saint-Eugène, Ontario, a village in the Township of East Hawkesbury

=== France ===
- Saint-Eugène, Aisne
- Saint-Eugène, Charente-Maritime
- Saint-Eugène, Saône-et-Loire
- Saint-Eugène, a former commune in Calvados, now integrated into Formentin

== See also ==
- Pope Eugene III (died 1153), Pope from 1145 to 1153
