= Eugenia Gabrieluk =

Russian pianist

- Born: Eugenia Gabrieluk Gabrieluk; 20 April 1967 (age 58); Moscow, Russia

Eugenia Gabrieluk Gabrieluk (born 20 April 1967) is a Russian pianist.

She started playing the piano in Moscow the age of five, where she learned the basic skills needed to be a professional. In 1981, she moved to Leningrad.

A few years later, Gabrieluk successfully finished her music studies, winning a prize called "Premio Extraordinario Fin de carrera de Piano y Música de Cámara". In 1991, she also won the "Fundación Guerrero prize", and the "Concurso Nacional de Juventudes Musicales de Granada" the following year.

She has given concerts in Russia, Italy, Germany, France, Denmark, United States, Brazil and Spain. She joined in the Liszt Festival, in which her mastery was proved.

Nowadays, Gabrieluk records songs for TV channels and RNE.

== Discography ==
- Barrios, Infante: Piano Music, Marco Polo 8.225164
- Infante: Pochades andaluses; El Vito, variations
