= Eugenius, Eugander, and Abilandius =

Eugenius, Eugander, and Abilandius are saints of the Coptic Church. Their feast day is held on March 10.

== Sources ==
- Holweck, F. G. A Biographical Dictionary of the Saints. St. Louis, MO: B. Herder Book Co. 1924.
