= Eugenia (fly) =

Scientific classification
- Domain: Eukaryota
- Kingdom: Animalia
- Phylum: Arthropoda
- Class: Insecta
- Order: Diptera
- Family: Tachinidae
- Genus: Eugenia; Robineau-Desvoidy, 1863

Type species
- Eugenia fugax Robineau-Desvoidy, 1863, by subsequent designation (Townsend, 1916: 7).

Subfamily of fly

Eugenia is a genus for flies in the family Tachinidae. Its status is uncertain and the genus and both species have been considered “doubtful taxa" in Tachinidae.

== Description ==
The genus was first described by Jean-Baptiste Robineau-Desvoidy in 1863 for two species from Southern France.

== Taxonomy ==
Eugenia contains the following species:

- Eugenia fugax Robineau-Desvoidy, 1863
- Eugenia silvatica Robineau-Desvoidy, 1863

In 2010, Evenhuis et al. reported the following: "CURRENT STATUS: Preoccupied by Gould, 1855; Martens, 1860; no replacement name proposed; placed in “Doubtful taxa in Tachinidae” by Herting & Dely-Draskovits (1993: 436)." Therefore, the identity of both species needs revision and possibly a replacement name for the genus needs to be established. It may be likely for both species to be synonyms of others that are well characterised under other names.
