= Eugenie Lautensach-Löffler =

German geographer and local historian (1902–1987)

- Born: Eugenie Löffler; 6 August 1902; Ramstein, Germany
- Died: 11 July 1987 (aged 84); Munich, Germany
- Burial place: Munich, Germany
- Occupation(s): Geographer, local historian
- Spouse: Hermann Lautensach
- Children: 2

Eugenie Lautensach-Löffler (6 August 1902 in Ramstein – 11 July 1987 in Munich) was a German geographer and local historian.

== Biography ==
Eugenie Lautensach-Löffler was the daughter of senior teacher Georg Löffler and his wife Martha (née Pletsch).

She grew up in Ramstein, Germany, and attended the local elementary school, then the higher female educational institution in Kaiserslautern. In 1922 she graduated from the humanistic Luisengymnasium in Munich. She then studied German, history and geography at the university there. In 1926, she completed her doctoral studies with a dissertation under Erich von Drygalski titled The surface design of the Palatinate Stepped Country.

After serving as an assistant to Drygalski, she worked as a specialist editor for geography in Freiburg from 1931. She worked in the map department of the German Foreign Institute in Stuttgart for a year in 1935 and then she returned to Ramstein in 1936 due to a research grant for research from the Palatinate Society for the Advancement of Science into the West Palatinate moorland.

In 1939, she married the geographer Hermann Lautensach, who taught at the University of Greifswald in Pomerania and they had two children. In 1947 she moved with her family to Stuttgart because her husband was appointed to the Institute of the Technical University. In 1950, she became an honorary member of the Pollichia, a research-based nature conservation association that concentrated on the Rhineland-Palatinate.

In 1956, she wrote a description of the Kaiserslautern Depression in the Handbook of the Natural Spatial Structure of Germany. In 1957, she dealt with the socio-geographical peculiarities of Ramstein, and again in 1965 with the paper Ramstein and Sembach - On the Change in Living Conditions in Two Palatine Airfield Communities, namely the Ramstein Air Base and the Sembach Air Base, which was still located near Sembach.

Lautensach-Löffler was committed to preserving local historic buildings and authored a 1965 essay lamenting the destruction of two striking structures in Ramstein. In addition to her many scientific publications, she also contributed to local chronicles, yearbooks and community calendars. In Ramstein-Miesenbach, a street near the high school (Dr. Eugenie Lautensach Strasse) is named after her.

Eugenie Lautensach-Löffler died 11 July 1987 in Munich and was buried in the Munich-Forstenried cemetery.
