= Perinița =

Perinița (or Pernița) is a traditional Romanian wedding folk dance. The dance is typical in the Muntenia region. The dance consists of participants forming a circle with one of the participants holding a handkerchief (or pillow) while dancing inside the circle. A circle of unmarried young people dance and accept him on the day before the marriage of one of the girls and it should be the last partner dance in which they will participate.

One of the guys goes out in the dance inside the circle, holding a handkerchief. The person then chooses a dance partner of the opposite sex by placing the handkerchief around his/her neck. They kiss on the cheek, the first person goes into the circle, while the second person repeats the process. The name of the dance comes from the word pillow (sometimes handkerchief). The pillow is used for men to kneel on as they choose a female partner. The Romanian word for pillow is "pernă" (from South Slavic "perina"), and the dance is called Pernița or Perinița after the "pernă" that is often used.

The song was featured as part of the soundtrack for the 2009 Ubisoft game Rabbids Go Home, performed by Moldovan gypsy brass band Fanfare Vagabontu.
