= Eugenie Fribourg =

American physician

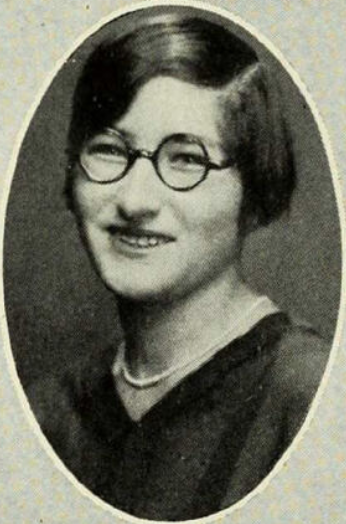
- Fribourg, from the 1929 yearbook of Barnard College
- Born: Eugenie Merzbach Fribourg; February 13, 1908; Brooklyn, New York, U.S.
- Died: January 28, 2007 (aged 98); Brooklyn, New York, U.S.
- Other name: Eugenie Fribourg Tykulsker
- Occupations: Physician, diabetes researcher

Eugenie Merzbach Fribourg (February 13, 1908 – January 28, 2007) was an American physician and endocrinologist based in Brooklyn, New York. She was on the staff of Brooklyn Hospital for over fifty years, and directed a pioneering outpatient clinic for the treatment of diabetes.

== Early life and education ==
Fribourg was born and raised in Brooklyn's Park Slope neighborhood, the daughter of Gustave Fribourg and Hortense Merzbach Fribourg. Her twin brother Louis became a real estate lawyer and a judge. Their family was Jewish, and belonged to Garfield Temple. She graduated from Barnard College in 1929. She was editor of the Barnard Bulletin, and a member of Barnard's baseball, basketball, and tennis teams. She worked in advertising and journalism before returning to school. She completed her medical degree at the Medical College of Virginia in 1939.

== Career ==
Fribourg was on the staff of Brooklyn Hospital from 1945 to 2002, working in family medicine and endocrinology, especially in the treatment of diabetes and metabolic conditions. She traveled in Asia lecturing about diabetes care in the 1966. In 1967 she was director of an innovative outpatient diabetes clinic at Cumberland Hospital, offering diet and exercise classes, nurses, ophthalmology and podiatry services, and Spanish-language interpreters. She was a clinical associate professor at Downstate Medical Center. In 1996 she won the Walter E. Reed Medal for her long service to the hospital.

== Publications ==
- "A Six-minute Test with Glucagon-free Insulin As a Guide to Treatment of Diabetes" (1954, with George E. Anderson)

== Personal life ==
Fribourg married Philip Morris Tykulsker in 1948; he died in 1961. She died in 2007, at the age of 98, in Brooklyn. There is a collection of her photographs and ephemera at the Center for Brooklyn History. Virginia Commonwealth University has a Eugenie M. Fribourg Scholarship Fund, for female medical school students in financial need.
