= Yevgenia Alissova-Klobukova =

Russian botanist

Yevgenia Nikolayevna Alissova-Klobukova (Russian: Евге́ния Никола́евна Али́сова-Клобуко́ва; 24 July 1889 – 13 January 1962) was a Soviet botanist known for collecting and identifying at least six species of pteridophytes and spermatophytes with coauthor Vladimir Leontyevich Komarov. The standard author abbreviation Aliss. is used to indicate this person as the author when citing a botanical name.

She was born in Varzi-Yatchi, Alnashsky District, Udmurtia.
