= Eugenia Brooks Frothingham =

American novelist (1874–1971)

Eugenia Brooks Frothingham (November 17, 1874 – December 30, 1971) was an American novelist.

== Life ==
Eugenia Brooks Frothingham was born on November 17, 1874, in Paris, to Eugenia (Mifflin) and Edward Frothingham. Octavius Frothingham was a more distant relative.

She studied music in Rome, Paris, and North Andover, Massachusetts.

She died on December 30, 1971, in Boston, Massachusetts.

== Works ==
=== The Turn of the Road (1901) ===
The Turn of the Road is about a singer, Winifred, who journeys from the United States to Europe to pursue her career abroad. Her lover, Dan, visits her every year in Paris until he suffers a misfortune that prevents from proposing (again) and from undertaking the yearly visit. Meanwhile, the heroine completes her studies and finds some success in Europe. But because she is emotionally dulled, her audience is not engaged; her singing becomes academic without emotional content. She returns home for her American debut. Once home, for the first time, she learns of her lover's misfortune and the reason he abandoned her. They reconcile and she finds musical success in America.

=== The Evasion (1906) ===
This novel centers on a love triangle between Gladys Lawrence, Richard (Dick) Copeland, and Arthur Davenport. Dick is ugly but has moral fortitude; Arthur is handsome but morally weak. Gladys marries Arthur. Arthur cheats at cards. Because Dick looks like a good person, Gladys assumes it is Arthur, not Dick, who is the cheater.

The contemporary reviewer for the Boston Evening Transcript largely panned the novel, observing that the novel "move[d] sluggishly and with no apparent purpose. … It is only Miss Frothingham's grace of style and keen literary sense that saves the story from becoming the crudest of melodramas. The manner of its telling is a sufficient and indeed the sole reason for its existence." The Buffalo Illustrated Times, by contrast, considered it a "brilliant story" comparable to Edith Wharton's The House of Mirth (1905).

In her 1984 assessment of The Evasion, the literary scholar Martha Banta likewise placed the novel in conversation with Wharton and Henry James's The Portrait of a Lady. Banta critiques Evasion, with reference to Portrait, because its characters are type-cast and insufficiently sophisticated. The misperception grounding Evasion is hollow because it simplistically contrasts good looks with bad character. James's characters are more fully formed. The perception of them is not a straightforward exercise of comparing surface with depth.

=== Her Roman Lover (1911) ===
The novel, like Turn of the Road, is about a young American woman, Anne Warren, who spends the winter with her aunt in Rome. She falls in love with a wealthy young man in Rome. He resents the fact that she has a male friend (who is also in love with her). One day, she wears a ribbon that her American friend chose for her; the Roman man becomes jealous and leaves her.

=== The Way of the Wind (1917) ===
Way of the Wind is a romance about a relationship with an eight-year age gap between Edgar Chilworth (the younger party) and Janet Eversly.

=== The Finding of Norah (1918) ===
This novel is about whether a woman should marry a man with whom she disagrees on politics. Set in Back Bay, Boston, shortly before World War I breaks out, it centers on the relationship between Norah and Henry, a recent Harvard graduate. The two disagree about the war and their relationship suffers.

=== Youth and I (1938) ===
Youth and I is a memoir about Frothingham's childhood, which she spent in Boston, Massachusetts, and various cities in Europe.
