= Eugenia L. Mobley =

American dentist (1922–2011)

- Eugenia Mobley, from a 1977 publication
- Born: 1922; Alabama
- Died: May 2, 2011 (aged 89); Nashville, Tennessee
- Other name: Eugenia Mobley McGinnis
- Occupations: Dentist, college administrator

Eugenia Lathy Mobley McGinnis (1922 – May 2, 2011) was an American dentist. She was dean of the dental school and vice-president at Meharry Medical College in Nashville, Tennessee.

== Early life and education ==
Mobley was born in Alabama, the daughter of Eugene Mobley and Gussie Dean Mobley. She earned her bachelor's degree at Tennessee State University in 1943, then earned her dentistry degree at Meharry Medical College in Nashville. She further earned a master's degree in public health at the University of Michigan in 1948. She was a member of Delta Sigma Theta.

== Career ==
Mobley was a dentist and professor of dentistry. From 1948 to 1950, she was director of public health dentistry for the Jefferson County Health Department in Alabama. She had a dental practice in Birmingham, Alabama, in the 1950s, while her husband was practicing as a physician at the Veterans Hospital in Tuskegee. In 1978, she became dean of the dental school at Meharry Medical College. She was the second woman to head an American dental school, after Jeanne Sinkford at Howard University in 1975. She later became the medical school's vice president. She oversaw Meharry's outreach for oral cancer prevention. She was a charter member of the Nashville chapter of The Links.

== Publications ==
Mobley's research in public health dentistry was published in academic journals, including Journal of the American Dental Association and Journal of Public Health Dentistry.

- "Dental caries and periodontal conditions among Negro children in Tennessee" (1960, with Martha B. Pointer)
- "Some social and economic factors relating to periodontal disease among young Negroes" (1963, with Stanley H. Smith)
- "Testing the oral hygiene index; its use in epidemiological studies" (1964)
- "Is dental health education the answer?" (1967, with Barbara H. Robinson and Martha B. Pointer)
- "Dental program for the chronically ill and aged" (1967)
- "Dental status and needs in a poverty‐population of North Nashville, Tennessee" (1969, with Martha B. Pointer)
- Dental Hygiene Examination Review: 1060 multiple choice questions and referenced explanatory answers (1969, with Theodore Edward Bolden and Elzer S. Chandler)

== Personal life and legacy ==
Eugenia L. Mobley married physician Charles William McGinnis in 1950. He died in 2002. Their son William Eugene McGinnis died in 2003. She died in 2011, aged 89 years, in Nashville. The Mobley/Singleton Lecture program at Meharry is named in honor of Eugenia Mobley and her colleague J. B. Singleton.
