= Eugénie de Gramont =

French nun

Eugénie de Gramont (17 September 1788, Versailles – 19 November 1846, Paris) was a French nun of the Society of the Sacred Heart.

== Life ==
She became a member of the Society of the Sacred Heart in 1806, encountering it at Amiens. Her aristocratic mother also joined it a few years afterwards, and made her novitiate under the guidance of her own daughter.

In 1815, despite her relative youth and the drawback of a slight physical deformity, de Gramont was placed in charge of the first school of the Sacred Heart, opened in Paris, Rue des Postes, afterwards transferred to the Rue de Varenne. The school flourished under her care and, after a short interruption of her work by the revolution of 1830, she was sent back to govern the house as superioress and continued to do so until her death in 1846.

Madeleine Sophie Barat, founder of the Society, had concerns, however. The two women were divided over the role of Louis de Sambucy de Saint-Estève; and in 1839 de Gramont opposed Barat. They were later reconciled.

== Family ==
Her father, the Count de Gramont d'Aster, was attached to the Court of Louis XVI; he had married a daughter of the Count de Boisgelin, maid of honour to Queen Marie Antoinette. The family was driven into exile by the French Revolution and the subsequent fall of the monarchy. After travelling in Germany and Italy, they settled at Richmond in England. After the death of the Count de Gramont d'Aster, his widow was for a time in straitened circumstances, and maintained herself and her child by teaching. She soon returned to France.
