= Eugenia Campbell Nowlin =

American artist, arts administrator, civil servant

- Born: Eugenia Campbell; June 6, 1908; San Luis Potosí, Mexico
- Died: November 15, 2003 (aged 95); Alexandria, Virginia, U.S.
- Education: Southern Methodist University, Texas Woman's University
- Spouse: Roy Samuel Nowlin (m. 1929–1932; death)

Eugenia Campbell Nowlin (née Eugenia Campbell; 6 June 1908 – 15 August 2003) was an American arts administrator, civil servant, teacher, and artist. She was the chair of the United States Army arts and crafts program for almost 3 decades. Nowlin was an Honorary Fellow of the American Craft Council starting in 1978.

== Biography ==
Nowlin as born 6 June 1908 in San Luis Potosí, Mexico; her father was a Methodist minister and her mother was a teacher. She was raised in Choctaw, Oklahoma and Texas.

Nowlin attended Southern Methodist University (1929 BA degree in fine art) and Texas Woman's University (formally known as Texas State College for Women; 1939 MFA degree). She was a still life and abstract painter. During World War II, she worked with the American Red Cross in Europe. She served as a Girl Scouts of the USA official in Minnesota.

Nowlin was a United States Army department civilian employee, who helped establish global arts and recreation programs at the military branches, from 1950 to 1978. She also taught art at George Washington University and at the NYU Washington, DC satellite campus.
