= The Links =

African-American women's organization

- Founded: November 9, 1946; 80 years ago Philadelphia, Pennsylvania, U.S.
- Type: Service
- Affiliation: Independent
- Status: Active
- Emphasis: African American women
- Scope: International
- Pillars: Friendship, Integrity, Honesty, Service, Commitment, Family Relationships, Courage, Respect for Self and Others, Legacy, Confidentiality, Responsibility, and Accountability
- Colors: Emerald Green and White
- Symbol: Globe of the world encircled by a chain
- Flower: White rose
- Chapters: 305
- Members: 17,000+ lifetime
- Headquarters: 1200 Massachusetts Avenue, NW; Washington, D.C. 20005; United States
- Website: linksinc.org

The Links, Incorporated is an American social and service organization of prominent Black women. The organization was founded in 1946 in Philadelphia, Pennsylvania. As of 2026, the organization has 305 chapters and more than 17,000 members in the United States and other countries. Prominent members include Kamala Harris and Betty Shabazz.

== History ==
The Links, Incorporated, a nonprofit corporation, originated in 1946 in Philadelphia, Pennsylvania. Founders Sarah Strickland Scott and Margaret Roselle Hawkins saw the need for a new kind of inner-city women's organization. They recruited the other founding members: Frances Atkinson, Katie Green, Marion Minton, Lillian Stanford, Myrtle Manigault Stratton, Lillian Wall, Dorothy Wright, and Eula Trigg.

All of the founding members were members of prominent Black professional families of Philadelphia; six were the wives of physicians and the seventh the wife of a bank president. All had Bachelor's or Master's degrees from elite universities, and had been active in other Black social organizations. Most were members of St. Thomas Episcopal Church.

Chapters were established in Atlantic City, New Jersey; Baltimore Maryland; Central New Jersey; Petersburg, Virginia; Philadelphia, Pennsylvania; Pittsburgh, Pennsylvania; Raleigh, North Carolina; Rocky Mount, North Carolina; St. Louis, Missouri; Tarboro, North Carolina; Wilmington, Delaware; Wilson, North Carolina; and Washington, D.C. Delegates from these chapters met for a national assembly on November 9, 1946, and officially established The Links. Hawkins served as its first president.

After the national assembly, members began contacting women in other cities to establish new chapters. The organization was incorporated on March 28, 1951. By 1952, it had 56 chapters. The Links was involved in the civil rights movement and supported the work of the National Association for the Advancement of Colored People (NAACP). In 1958, The Links expanded its efforts to support youth services.

During the 1960s, The Links was criticized for lack of social consciousness and elitism. Later changes included supporting education and health for both African Americans and Africans. In 1974, the group made its largest single donation—$132,000—to the United Negro College Fund to support historically Black colleges and universities. It became active in cultural projects, such as the Cleveland Museum of Art, suggested by the Cleveland chapter. By 1999, The Links had 10,000 members in 270 chapters.

Over the decades, The Links transformed itself from "a group of women married to influential men, to a group of women who became influential themselves", according to one member. The evolution caused "clear conflict between the old guard and the new guard", according to another. In 2008, there were approximately 12,000 members of 273 chapters of The Links in 42 states. By 2022, The Links had grown to 16,000 members and 292 chapters in the United States, The Bahamas, and the United Kingdom. The Links Foundation, Inc. is a separate philanthropic organization.

== Symbols ==
The group's name was suggested by founding member Lillian Wall as a symbol of enduring friendship. The Links' core values or pillars are friendship, integrity, honesty, service, commitment, family relationships, courage, respect for self and others, legacy, confidentiality, responsibility, and accountability. The emblem is a globe of the world, encircled by a chain. Its colors are emerald green and white. Its flower is the white rose.

== Organization ==
The Links' national headquarters is located in Washington, D.C. In August 1984, The Links purchased a building there to house both the society and The Links' related foundation. In 1954, The Links decentralized its operations into four geographic areas: Central, Eastern, Southern, and Western. Each area oversees the chapters located within its states. Chapters are also organized into clusters or groups of chapters located within the same metro area. In 1999, each chapter's membership was limited to no more than 55 women.

== Membership ==
Women interested in joining any of the local chapters must be nominated by a current member. If a chapter has 55 members, no more members may be accepted until one leaves. Admission is "extremely competitive", according to Lawrence Otis Graham. One member of a Washington, D.C. chapter describes having spent "twelve years of strategizing, party-giving, and brown-nosing to get into this group." Most women do not join The Links until they are in their forties or older, and most remain members until they die.

The Links has been criticized for exclusivity. One member noted that while a woman could be nominated by any other member, for practical intents those admitted are "usually those who know at least half of the chapter's membership". Social, professional, or economic prominence within a city's Black population also may help get a candidate admitted, as members with such backgrounds help add to the chapter's prestige.

== Activities ==
Chapters typically also hold multiple social events for a city's Black elites, such as debutante cotillions, fashion shows, gala fund-raisers, balls, luncheons, and formal parties. Members are required to accumulate volunteer hours. The national core focuses include education, health, youth services, art, domestic legislation, and international welfare. The Links has provided support to Africare, the Haitian Refugee Center, the NAACP, the Schomburg Center for Research in Black Culture, and the United Negro College Fund.

== Chapters ==
As of 2026, there were 305 chapters of The Links, located in the United States, the United Kingdom, and the Commonwealth of the Bahamas.

== Notable members ==
As of 2026, The Links has more than 17,000 members. The group's members include philanthropists, college presidents, politicians, activists, judges, doctors, bankers, lawyers, executives, educators, and the wives of well-known public figures. Prominent members include Stacey Adams, Keisha Lance Bottoms, Misty Copeland, Kamala Harris, and Betty Shabazz.

== Importance ==
According to Lawrence Otis Graham, The Links is the "most elite organization" for prominent American Black women, and is both the largest and the most influential. Membership in the organization, he writes, signals to other prominent blacks that "your social background, lifestyle, physical appearance, and family's academic and professional accomplishments passed muster".

Los Angeles PBS station KCET called The Links "the most prominent" of the Black women's clubs. Rolling Stone called it "one of the most influential and prestigious". John Lewis referred to The Links as a "distinguished organization of outstanding community service and influence".

== See also ==
- List of African-American fraternities and sororities
