= Eugenio =

Eugenio is an Italian and Spanish masculine given name deriving from the Greek 'Eugene'. The name is Eugénio in Portuguese and Eugênio in Brazilian Portuguese.

The name's translated literal meaning is well born, or of noble status. Similar derivative names such as Gino come from Eugenio, or Eugene. Similar names include Eugenios, Efigenio, Eugine and Eugenius.

== People ==
=== Aristocracy ===
- Eugenio Alfonso Carlo Maria Giuseppe, Prince of Savoy-Genoa
- Eugenio Brunetta d'Usseaux, Italian nobleman
- Eugenio Consolini, Italian aristocrat
- Eugenio da Palermo, admiral of the Kingdom of Sicily
- Eugenio Daza, Filipino principale, educator and military leader
- Eugenio Lascorz, pretender to a royal house of Byzantium

=== Business ===
- Eugenios Eugenidis, Greek shipping magnate, benefactor and philanthropist
- Eugenio Garza Lagüera, Mexican businessman and philanthropist
- Eugenio Garza Sada, Mexican businessman and philanthropist
- Eugenio Lopez III, current chairman and chief executive officer of ABS-CBN
- Eugenio Lopez, Jr., former chairman emeritus of ABS-CBN Broadcasting Corporation
- Eugenio Lopez, Sr., founder of the Manila Chronicle and Chronicle Broadcasting Network
- Eugenio Mendoza, Venezuelan business tycoon

=== Film, journalism and television ===
- Eugenio Abunda, Jr., Filipino television host, publicist, talent manager and celebrity endorser
- Eugenio Batres Garcia, Nicaraguan journalist, political commentator, newscaster and writer
- Eugenio Bava, Italian cinematographer
- Eugenio Centenaro Kerrigan, Italian Brazilian film director and screenwriter
- Eugenio Derbez, Mexican comedy actor and Formula Three auto driver
- Eugenio Martín, Spanish film director and screenwriter
- Eugenio Siller, Mexican actor and singer
- Eugenio Zanetti, Argentine dramatist, painter, film set designer, and theater and opera director

=== Fine arts ===
- Eugenio Agneni, Italian painter
- Eugenio Caxés, Spanish painter of the Baroque
- Eugenio Da Venezia, Italian painter
- Eugenio Granell, Spanish Surrealist painter
- Eugenio Tavolara, Sardinian artist

=== Music ===
- Eugenio Cavallini, Italian conductor, composer, violinist, and violist
- Eugenio Colombo, Italian saxophonist and flautist
- Eugenio Fernandi, Italian tenor
- Eugenio Finardi, Italian singer, songwriter, guitarist and keyboardist
- Eugenio Giraldoni, Italian operatic baritone
- Eugenio di Pirani (1852–1939), Italian pianist, music educator, composer, and critic
- Eugenio Toussaint, Mexican composer, arranger and jazz musician.

=== Politics ===
- Eugenio Aguilar, President of El Salvador, 1946-1948
- Eugenio Alvarez (1918–1976), New York assemblyman
- Eugenio Arbones, Spanish physician and socialist politician
- Eugenio Bergamasco (1858–1940), Italian engineer and politician
- Eugenio Cambaceres, Argentine writer and politician
- Eugenio Elorduy Walther, Mexican politician
- Eugenio Fernández Cerra, former Puerto Rican Senator
- Eugenio Hernández Flores, Mexican politician
- Eugenio Manuvakola, the leader of UNITA Renovada
- Eugenio Martínez, member of the anti-Castro movement in the early 1960s
- Eugenio Perente-Ramos, founder of the National Labor Federation (NATLFED)
- Eugenio Pérez, Filipino politician
- Eugenio Rodríguez Vega, Costa Rican writer, politician, and historian
- Eugenio Tandonnet, French utopian socialist
- Eugenio Tarabini, late Italian politician and lawyer
- Eugenio Torres Larrañaga (1889–...), Chilean farmer and politician
- Eugenio Viale (1939–2026), Italian politician

=== Religion ===
- Eugênio de Araújo Sales (1920–2012), Roman Catholic cardinal from Brazil
- Eugenio Duarte, Church of the Nazarene minister
- Eugenio Kincaid, American Baptist missionary
- Felix Eugenio Mkhori, Malawian Roman Catholic prelate
- Luíz Eugênio Pérez, Brazilian Roman Catholic prelate
- Pope Pius XII, born Eugenio Pacelli
- Eugénio Salessu, was the Roman Catholic bishop of the Roman Catholic Diocese of Malanje, Angola
- Eugenio Scarpellini, Italian priest
- Eugenio Tosi, Italian cardinal
- Eugenius Vulgarius, Italian priest and poet
- Eugenio Zolli, Chief Rabbi of Rome

=== Sciences, technology and mathematics ===
- Eugenio Barsanti, Italian engineer
- Eugenio Beltrami, Italian mathematician
- Eugenio Berríos, Chilean biochemist
- Eugenio Calabi (1923–2023), Jewish Italian American mathematician
- Eugenio Cantatore, Italian Dutch electrical engineer
- Eugenio Celedón (1926–2018), Chilean engineer, academic, researcher and businessperson
- Eugenio Curiel, Italian physicist
- Eugenio de Bellard Pietri, speleologist
- Eugenio Elia Levi, Italian mathematician
- Eugenio Giuseppe Togliatti, Italian mathematician
- Eugenio Oñate Ibañez de Navarra, Spanish engineer

=== Sports ===
- Eugenio Amore, Italian beach volleyball player
- Eugenio Arenaza (1923–1983), Peruvian footballer
- Eugenio Balanqué, retired Cuban decathlete
- Eugenio Canfari, early Italian football player
- Eugenio Castellotti (1930–1957), Italian Formula One driver
- Eugenio Corini, Italian association football coach and former player
- Eugenio Fascetti, Italian professional football coach and a former player
- Eugenio Faxas, Dominican golfer
- Eugenio Fernando Bila, Mozambican football player
- Eugênio German, Brazilian chess master
- Eugenio Gestri, Italian professional road bicycle racer
- Eugenio Hilario, Spanish professional association football player
- Eugenio Konrad, Hungarian footballer and manager
- Eugenio Lamanna, Italian professional football player
- Eugenio Lazzarini, Italian former Grand Prix motorcycle road racing World Champion
- Eugenio Leal, retired Spanish footballer
- Eugenio Luperto, football philosopher of De Zerbismo and Allegrismo
- Eugenio Mena, Chilean left defender or midfielder
- Eugenio Monti, Italian bobsledder
- Eugenio Morel, retired professional footballer
- Eugenio Neves, Portuguese footballer
- Eugenio Peralta, Paraguayan footballer
- Eugenio Perico (1951–2025), Italian football player and manager
- Eugenio Rizzolini, retired Italian professional footballer
- Eugênio Rômulo Togni, Brazilian footballer
- Eugenio Rossi (athlete) (born 1992), athlete from San Marino specialising in the high jump
- Eugenio Rossi (tennis) (born 1969), Italian retired professional tennis player
- Eugenio Serrano, Spanish handball player
- Eugenio Siena, Italian race-car driver
- Eugenio Staccione, Italian professional footballer
- Eugenio Suárez, Major League Baseball Player
- Eugenio Suárez Santos, Spanish professional footballer
- Eugenio Szabados, Hungarian-Italian chess master
- Eugenio Torres Villarreal, Mexican Luchador, or professional wrestler, television host and rapper
- Eugenio Torre, Filipino chess grandmaster
- Eugenio Vélez, Major League Baseball player
- Eugene Currie, Rugby league player

=== Writing ===
- Eugenio Agacino y Martínez, Spanish sailor and writer
- Eugenio Barba, Italian author and theatre director based in Denmark
- Eugenio Corti, Italian writer
- Eugenio d'Ors, Spanish Catalan writer, essayist, journalist, philosopher and art critic
- Eugénio de Andrade, Portuguese poet
- Eugénio de Castro, Portuguese writer and author
- Eugenio de Ochoa, Spanish author, writer and translator
- Eugénio de Paula Tavares, Cape Verdean poet
- Eugenio Fuentes, Spanish novelist
- Eugenio Mimica Barassi (1949–2021), Chilean writer
- Eugenio Montale, Italian poet, prose writer, editor and translator, winner of the Nobel Prize for Literature
- Eugenio Montejo, Venezuelan poet and essay writer
- Eugenio Scalfari, Italian journalist
- Eugenio Sellés, Spanish writer, journalist, playwright and politician

=== Other ===
- Eugenio Pratts, Developer, lawyer, intellectual, philosopher, and human rights advocate
- Eugenio Balzan
- Eugenio Biagini, Italian historian
- Eugenio Caballero, Mexican production designer
- Eugenio Calò (1905–1943), Italian partisan
- Eugenio Coşeriu, Romanian-German linguist
- Eugenio Courret, French photographer
- Eugenio de Salazar, Spanish explorer
- Eugenio Domingo Solans, Spanish economist
- Eugenio Donato, Armenian-Italian deconstructionist, literary critic, and “philosophical critic”
- Eugenio Espejo, medical pioneer, writer and lawyer of mestizo origin in colonial Ecuador
- Eugenio Fernández Quintanilla (1887−1932), Spanish architect
- Eugenio Ficalbi (1858–1922), Italian entomologist and zoologist
- Eugenio Garin, Italian philosopher and Renaissance historian
- Eugenio Gerardo Lobo, Spanish soldier and poet
- Eugenio Lopez (disambiguation)
- Eugenio López Alonso, founder of the Colección Jumex
- Eugenio María de Hostos, Puerto Rican educator, philosopher, intellectual, lawyer, sociologist and independence advocate
- Eugenio Miccini, Italian artist and writer
- Eugenio Raúl Zaffaroni, Argentine lawyer
- Eugenio Recuenco, Spanish photographer
- Eugenio Rignano, Italian philosopher
- Eugenio Sanz-Orozco Mortera, martyr of the Spanish civil war
- Eugenio Sicomoro, Italian comic book artist
- Eugenio Trías Sagnier, Spanish philosopher
- Eugenio Vegas Latapié, Spanish monarchist writer, activist and conspirator

== See also ==
- Eugene (given name)
- Eugenia (name)
