= Tavolara (disambiguation) =

Tavolara may refer to:

Places

- Tavolara Island, an island off the coast of Sardinia, site of a micronation
  - Kingdom of Tavolara
- Tavolara, a fictional town and island in the Philippines ruled by a cannibal king, in the 1902 comic opera "Queen Philippine," produced by the Pi Eta theatrical society at Harvard University

People

- Eugenio Tavolara (1901–1963), Sardinian artist

Ships

- Tavolara, an Italian steamship, sunk in June 1916 along with the Rondino and five smaller vessels, the Francesco Fadre, the Era, the Antonla V, the Annetta, and the Adelia
- Tavolara, an Italian tugboat in use 1916–1943
- Tavolara, an Italian tugboat in use 1956–1976
- Tavolara, a ship in the modern Italian navy

Other

- Società Sportiva Tavolara Calcio, an Italian football club
- Tavolara, a racehorse, fl. 1913–1915
