= Pirani =

Pirani may refer to:

== People ==
- Amina Pirani Maggi (1892–1979), Italian stage and film actress
- Arlind Pirani (born 1990), Albanian footballer
- Felix Pirani (1928-2015), British theoretical physicist and political activist
- Frederick Pirani (1859-1926), New Zealand politician
- Marcello Pirani (1880–1968), German physicist, inventor of the Pirani gauge
- Mario Pirani (1952-2015), Italian journalist

== Other uses ==
- Pirani (Sufism)
- Pirani gauge, a thermal conductivity gauge used for measuring pressure in vacuum systems
