= Consolini =

Consolini is an Italian surname. Notable people with the surname include:

- Adolfo Consolini (1917–1969), Italian Olympic athlete
- Nicolò Consolini (born 1984), Italian footballer
- Eugenio Consolini (1913–1996), Italian noble
- Domenico Consolini (1806–1884), Italian Roman Catholic bishop and cardinal
- Giovanni Consolini (1818–1906), Italian composer
- Joseph Consolini (born 1975), Entrepreneur
