= Leonor De Ovando =

Dominican poet

- Born: 1544; Santo Domingo, Dominican Republic
- Died: Between 1610 and 1616; Santo Domingo, Dominican Republic
- Occupations: writer and nun

Leonor De Ovando (1544–c.1610) was a Dominican poet and nun, remembered as the first poet in all the Colonial Americas. She wrote religious sonnets and divine verses.

== Life ==
De Ovando was born in Santo Domingo into a wealthy criollo family of Extramadura origins around 1544, and had at least three siblings, according to her correspondence with Eugenio de Salazar. She professed at the Dominican Monastery of Regina Angelorum in her hometown early in life around 1568. She must have been one of the first professed, because the monastery's royal license was obtained in 1557, the first nuns moving in there in 1560.

In 1583, Sister De Ovando was elected prioress. Its chapel wasn't even finished when, in 1586 the English privateer Francis Drake's sacking destroyed it. Its nuns, among them De Ovando, who was already forty-six years old, were forced to abandon the monastery and flee to the interior of the island. When the corsair left, De Ovando helped lead the restoration efforts of the monastery, whose nuns had to live almost on the charity of the neighbors for several years. Still, in 1599, the walls of the temple were raised at half height.

Sister de Ovando wrote a letter to the King requesting financial help for the convent. In 1595 and 1605, as superior, she wrote again asking for funds. De Ovando complained by letter to the King about the trajectory of abuses and arbitrariness committed by Governor Osorio when executing the depopulation of the cities in the north of the island from 1605 to 1606. She was accused of public interference "in business involving people of higher offices in the republics and in business of lawsuits in which all religious, particularly women, must be very remote for being outside their profession (...) for being outside of all order and religion, and something foreign that women treat her (...) .” Although we have no other testimonies to date, it is striking that just two years after this religious and secular persecution, Sister Leonor died in the convent of Santa Catalina around 1610.

== Literary work ==
We know very little about her poetic production: just five sonnets and a few individual verses (los versos blancos). They are related to the love of the divine and some of her sonnets respond to the poetic work of Eugenio de Salazar, who in 1574, she began her poetic exchange with during the first year of his stay in Hispaniola.

== Published works ==
Five of Ovando's sonnets and some individual verses, written between 1574 and 1580, have been preserved in Silva's anthology of poetry, compiled by Salazar during the years 1585 to 1595 and preserved today in the Real Academy of History in Madrid, Spain. This literary production had remained unpublished until it was discovered by the Spanish literary critic Marcelino Menéndez Pelayo and included in his Anthology of Hispanic-American Poets. The compositions were the result of correspondence between Ovando and Salazar. Four of the five sonnets correspond to special festivals on the Catholic calendar: Christmas, Epiphany, Easter and Pentecost.

According to Justo Planas, Ovando's surviving works are indicative of early culture on the island.

Her poems, in dialogue with the Spanish [writer] Eugenio de Salazar, are evidence that there was a literate community in Hispaniola. The only one that has survived today of her poetic voice was part of a concert. This is made evident by the fluency of her verse that comes from a habitual practice and a context of critical readers and writers to emulate.
