= Eugênio =

Eugênio, sometimes Eugénio, is a Portuguese masculine given name equivalent to Spanish Eugenio.

== People ==
- Eugênio Sales (1920–2012), Brazilian cardinal
- Eugênio Izecksohn (1932–2013), Brazilian herpetologist
- Eugénio Fernando Bila (born 1979), Mozambican football player
- Eugênio German (1930–2001), Brazilian chess master
- Eugénio Neves (born 1987), Portuguese footballer
- Eugênio Rômulo Togni (born 1982), Brazilian footballer
