= Close Quarters =

Close Quarters may refer to:

- Close Quarters (Gilbert), a novel by Michael Gilbert
- Close Quarters (Golding), a novel by William Golding
- Close Quarters, a novel by Kenneth Bulmer, writing as Adam Hardy
- Close Quarters, a novel by Jeff Gulvin
- Close Quarters, a novel by Larry Heinemann
- Close Quarters, a 1943 documentary directed by Jack Lee about a British submarine patrol in the Second World War
- "Close Quarters" (The Professionals), an episode of the crime action television drama series

== See also ==
- Close-quarters combat
- At Close Quarters, a 2007 novel
