= Cantatore =

Cantatore is a surname. Notable people with the surname include:

- Domenico Cantatore (1906–1998), Italian painter, mosaic artist, and illustrator
- Eugenio Cantatore, Italian electrical engineer
- Vicente Cantatore (1935–2021), Argentine football player and manager
