= Tavolara Island =

Island in Sardinia, Italy

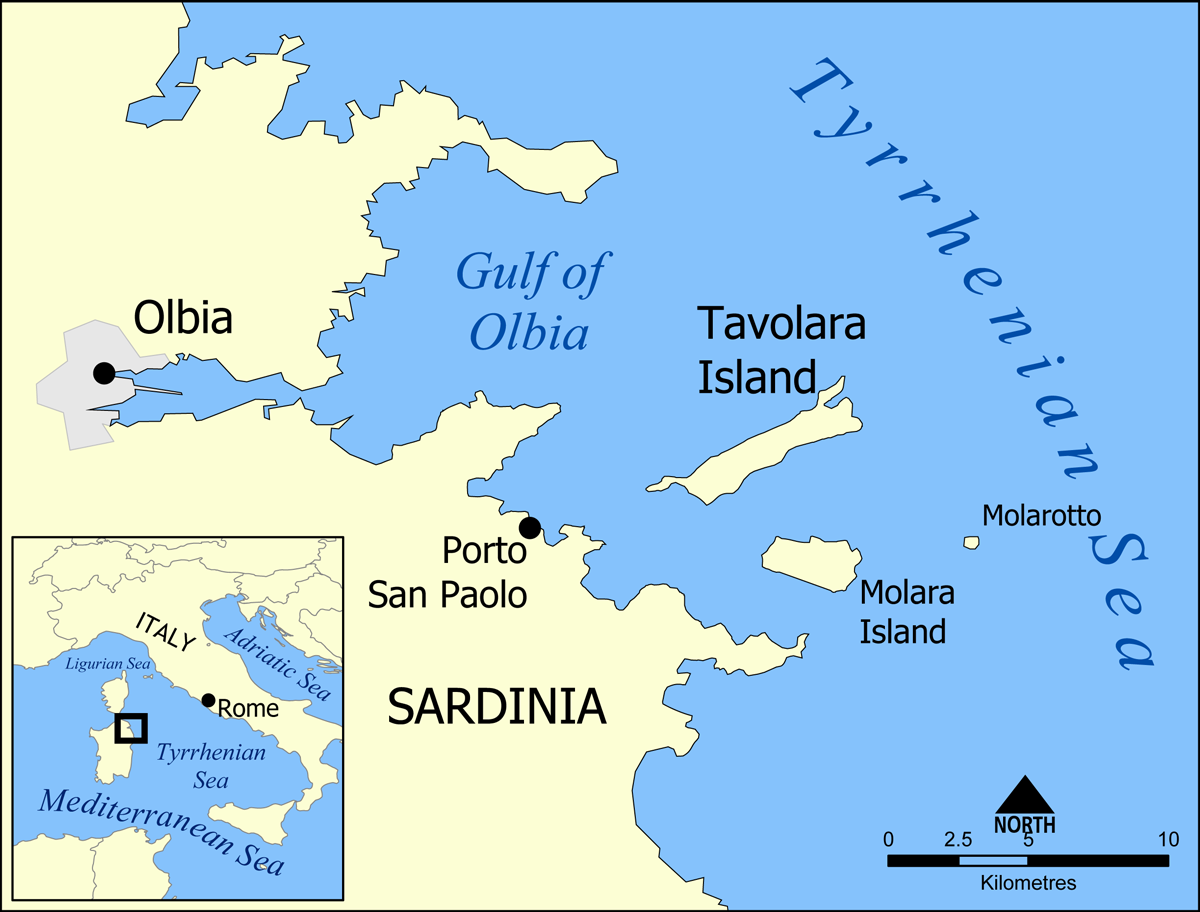
location of Tavolara Island

Tavolara is a small island off the northeast coast of Sardinia, Italy. The island is a limestone massif 5 kilometres (3 miles) long and 1 kilometre (0.6 miles) wide, with steep cliffs except at its ends. Its highest point, Monte Cannone, is 565 metres (1,854 feet) above sea level. A cove and beach can be found at each end of the island, Spalmatore di Fuori at the northeast, and Spalmatore di Terra at the southwest. Currently, the island is inhabited by only a handful of families, and has a small cemetery and summer restaurant. The water around the island is a popular spot for scuba diving.

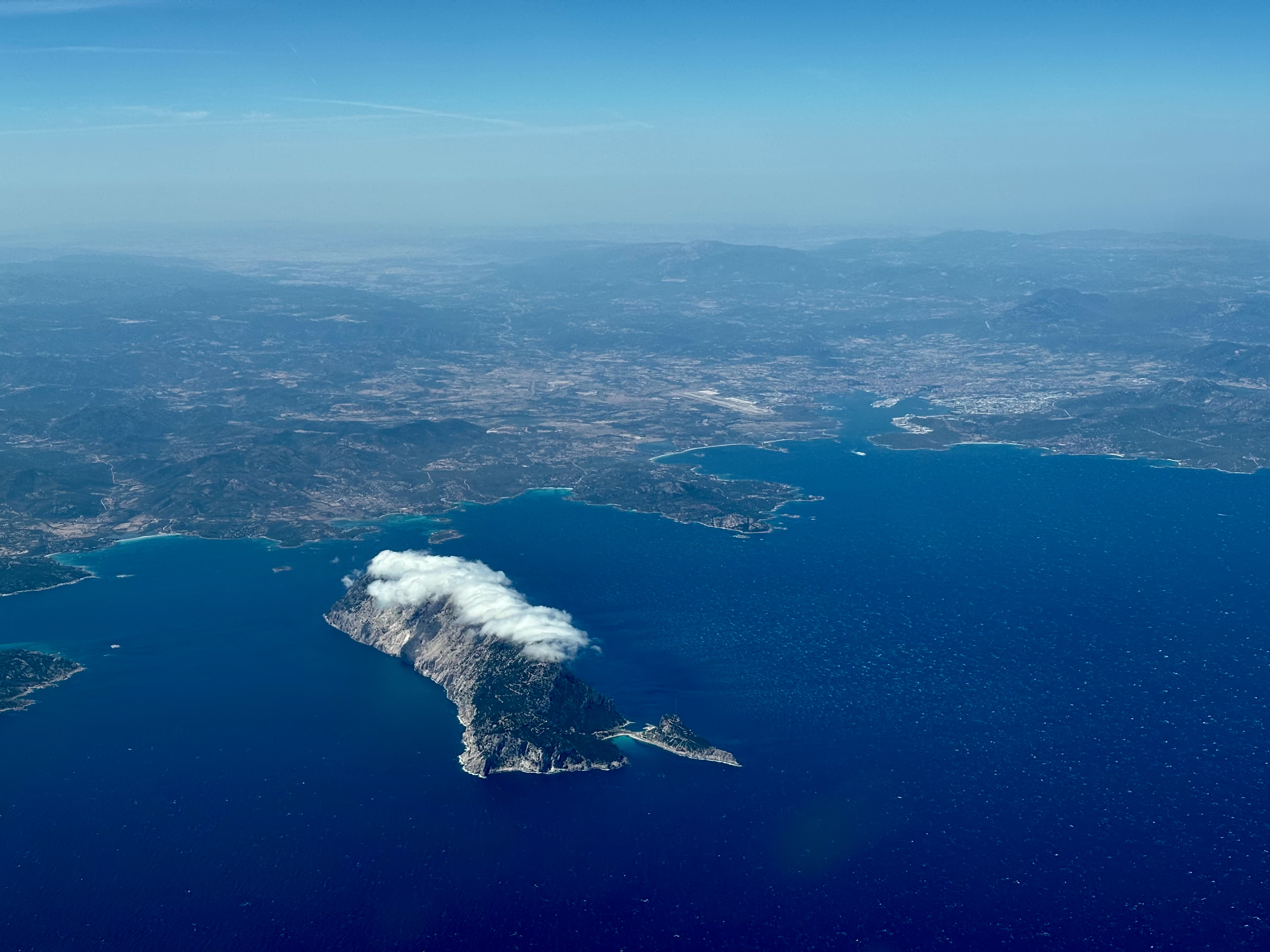
Aerial view of the coast and Tavolara

The nearest sizable town is Olbia, and the small fishing village of Porto San Paolo is directly across a small strait. The islands of Molara and Molarotto are nearby.

Most of the population of the island was displaced in 1962 when a NATO radiogoniometric station was constructed on the eastern half of the island. The aerials from the station can be seen from quite a distance, and that entire half of the island is restricted to military personnel.

Tavolara is also home of the VLF-transmitter ICV, which works on 20.27 kHz and 20.76 kHz and which is used for transmitting messages to submarines. It can also be received (but not decoded) by PCs with a coil antenna at the soundcard entrance and FFT-analysis software.

The island and the surrounding waters are part of the Tavolara and Punta Coda Cavallo Marine Preserve created in 1997. The environmental protections placed on the park have added restrictions to the use of the area for tourism.

A natural column of rock on the island's coast resembles a human figure and is known as "the Stone Sentry" or "Pope's Rock." Other stone formations include "Ulysses' Bow" (a natural arch) and the "Grotta del Papa" (a cave accessible by sea and boasting Neolithic cave paintings).

== Flora and fauna ==
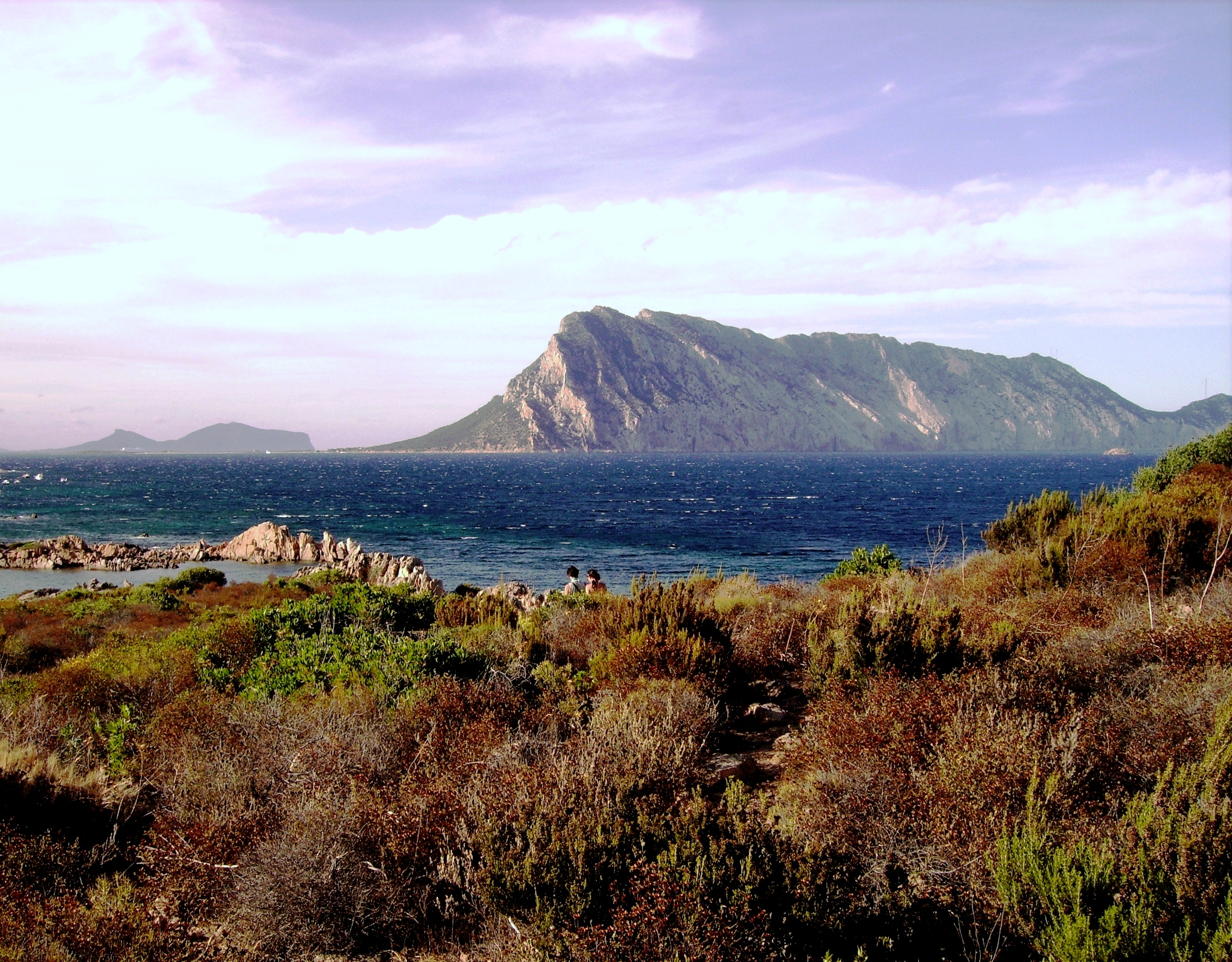
Tavolara from the Sardinian shore

A rare species of thorny knapweed, Centaurea horrida, is endemic only to Tavolara and a few other fringe areas of northern Sardinia. In his Natural History of Sardinia (1774), Francesco Cetti reported huge rats inhabiting Tavolara, but these were likely Sardinian pikas, an endemic species of lagomorph that had already been driven to extinction in Sardinia proper by then.

During the 18th century, Sardinian lore claimed the wild goats of Tavolara had gold teeth. The goat herds were moved to Sardinia when the NATO station was built and it was assumed there are no longer any goats on the island. However, in 2024 goats have been spotted again. The critically endangered monk seal had a breeding colony here until the 1960s. Once the home of a thriving lobster industry, Tavolara now attracts divers who come to view the coral, sponges, sea anemones, bottlenose dolphins, and even a few specimens of Pinna nobilis, the rare giant clam whose byssus fibers were formerly used in the manufacture of sea silk for royal garments.

== History ==
Flag of the Kingdom of Tavolara.

The island was known in ancient times as Hermea. According to tradition, Pope St. Pontian died on Tavolara following his abdication and exile in 235. It is probably the island previously called Tolar, which was used by some Arab ships in 848–849 as a base to attack nearby coasts.

Joachim Murat visited Tavolara in 1815 during his attempt to regain the Kingdom of Naples. At that time the island was uninhabited.

In 1836 the imaginary kingdom of Tavolara was given to the Bertoleoni family by Charles Albert the King of Sardinia.

After Italian unification, “King Paolo” actively sought recognition from Italy. During his “reign”, in 1868 the Italian government began operating a lighthouse on the northeast end of the island.

The tomb of one of its members “Paolo I” is in the graveyard on the island, surmounted by a crown.

== VLF- Antenna ==
The VLF-antenna of Tavolara VLF transmitter is spun between a 133-metre-tall mast at 40°55′23″N 9°43′51.51″E on Spalmatore di Fuori and 4 masts, which are situated on mountains southwards. They are situated at 40°54′52.45″N 9°44′9.03″E, at 40°54′51.42″N 9°44′8.21″E, at 40°54′51.09″N 9°43′30.38″E and at 40°54′51.09″N 9°43′28.91″E The two masts on the eastern mountain are 114 metres (374 feet) tall, the two others are smaller.

== In popular culture ==
Tavolara is the name given to a fictional island in the Philippines ruled by a cannibal king, in the 1902 Harvard comic opera "Queen Philippine."

== See also ==
- List of islands of Italy
- Kingdom of Tavolara

== Sources ==
- United States Hydrographic Office, Great Britain Hydrographic Office, Great Britain Admiralty, United States Navy Dept (1917), Mediterranean Pilot, v. 2, pp. 416-417
- "Geography of Tavolara". Archived from the original on 2021-12-11.
- "Wildlife of Tavolara". Archived from the original on 2021-12-11.
