= Eugenios =

Eugenios is a masculine given name. It may refer to:

- Eugenios of Trebizond, 4th century Christian saint and martyr
- E. M. Antoniadi (1870–1944), Greek-French astronomer Eugène Michel Antoniadi, also known as Eugenios Antoniadis
- Eugenios Eugenidis (1882–1954), Greek shipping magnate
- Eugenios Voulgaris (1716–1806), Greek scholar, Greek Orthodox educator and bishop of Kherson

== See also ==
- Eugenio
- Eugene (given name)
