= Efigenio =

Efigenio is a masculine given name. Notable people with the name include:

- Efigenio Ameijeiras (1931–2020), Cuban military commander
- Efigenio Favier (born 1959), Cuban fencer

== See also ==
- Eugenio
