= At Close Quarters =

2009 novel by Eugenio Fuentes

- Author: Eugenio Fuentes
- Translator: Martin Schifino
- Cover artist: James Nunn
- Language: Spanish
- Genre: Crime novel
- Publisher: Arcadia Books
- Publication date: 2009
- Publication place: Spain
- Media type: Print (Paperback)
- Pages: 276
- ISBN: 978-1-906413-36-1

At Close Quarters is a 2007 novel by Spanish author Eugenio Fuentes. Martin Schifino's English translation appeared in 2009 under Arcadia Books' imprint Euro Crime.

== Plot ==
The unexpected death of a highly disciplined and successful army member of Camp San Marcial is officially explained as suicide. Major Olmedo had always followed the letter of the law and never questioned orders through the army hierarchy. He only broke the law in one respect and that was to carry an unauthorized pistol, since his name had appeared on a terrorist organization's hit-list.

Major Olmedo had recently completed a report which was commissioned by the Ministry of Defence in Madrid. In it, he recommended the closure of Camp San Marcial as an efficiency measure. This highlighted the growing cleavage between his own generation and style of troop which were dedicated to peace-keeping and winning wars with technology; vis-a-vis the older, Francoists, who still believed in numbers and yearned for a reinstatement of the recently abolished compulsory military service.

When he gets shot there is an internal inquiry which results in a verdict of suicide. Marina, the Major's daughter, is not satisfied with this outcome and hires a private detective, Ricardo Cupido. Cupido sets about investigating the "crime" scene with rigour and a professional manner. The scene itself simply is the pistol and a note in hurried handwriting saying two words, Forgive me scrawled on one of the Major's business cards.

Cupido questions each of the suspects and mulls over this problem even where Marina gives up on learning the truth because of the strain it is putting on her and dismisses him. Cupido does get to the bottom of the mystery.

== Main characters ==
Samuel is a young man who has come through a divorce and lives by himself. He has a corner-house with a suntrap balcony and many plants and flowers that he tends to as his main hobby. He also does some photography. His business is in paper collection and recycling which he developed from his father's business as rag-and-bone man.

Samuel gets infatuated with a beautiful young woman, Marina, who has two children one of whom she drops off at the school bus-stop each morning outside Samuel's house. Samuel one morning sets up his digital camera to take a picture of the lady, and programmes it to take a snap every 60 seconds. He comes home after work to find rather more than just pictures of her.

He seizes his opportunity to get to know her by observing a dropped gold bracelet and then the next day rushing out to go and return it to her. He reaches her as she is getting to the steps to her own apartment and is surprised to learn she only lived nearby all along.

Samuel and Marina get chatting and she is equally surprised to learn the plants she had been admiring belonged to his house because she is also a keen gardener. They become an item.

Marina Olmedo is the daughter of the dead soldier. She has two children but has divorced from their father, Jaime. Jaime kept the business whilst she kept the house. Marina is beautiful and sensuous and after seven months is ready to move in with Samuel.

Major Camilo Olmedo is a long-serving soldier with an impeccable record and fully disciplined and respectful of the military hierarchy. However very few of his colleagues actually like him, because he recognizes that times have changed and that modern armies are fighting the terrorist within rather than the enemy nation without.

Major Olmedo's one misdemeanour is to always carry the type of pistol for which he has not been authorized, and he does so because he trusts no-one. He will sit with his back to a wall in any public place and is always on the lookout; this is why it was necessary for the army to reach a verdict of suicide where they investigated because it was so unexpected that he should be murdered.

Olmedo's wife, Marina's mother, had died under anaesthetic when she had been in for cosmetic surgery.

Captain Bramante is one of the Camp Marcial colleagues who was upset at Olmedo's report. Both he and Captain Ucha were absent from an informal meeting scheduled right after Olmedo delivered his damning report, to determine what their stance should be. Bramante falsely claimed to have been at the gym working out. His marriage is actually in danger and this lie ended up proving a red-herring because really he has been trying to hide things from a wife who is no longer proud of him, and he would love to go to Afghanistan and die what he considers a hero's death.

Captain Ucha is the other Camp Marcial colleague who was under suspicion as a potential enemy of the Major's but without an immediate alibi. He is elderly and that three grown up daughters. He claimed to have been driving around at the time the death must have taken place.

Ricardo Cupido: the private detective who does not give up on the case. He has an uncertain past but what is certain is that he has plenty of sympathy for thosefor whom out of grief badly require his services. He is persistent in retrieving the information he wants and often catches suspects out by thinking ahead of them. He discovers who committed the crime but feels oddly let down at the end because it is not a happy ending for all.

Alkalino is Cupido's side-kick. He is described as not being particularly well turned-out and who has excessive amounts of facial hair. His main contribution is to hunt out a sixteen-year-old girl named Violeta who may have some useful information.

Gabriela is a major suspect and at the centre of the main relationships. She is the mother of a 15-year-old boy who is savagely killed by a pit-bull terrier. She is single and the boy Manuel is all she had. She starts a relationship with Major Olmedo after her son was attacked and she becomes somewhat close to Marina. She has pictures of Manuel all over her apartment.

Jaime is the former husband of Marina's and he is very good-looking and plays a lot with different women. He owns a business where he is hired to do jobs involving high-rise buildings. He did not get along with Olmedo and so was also a suspect not least because he was trying to claim some assets which were not in his name and he had not been keeping up with his alimony.

Doctor Lesmes Beltrán is the anaesthetist who had given too much drugs to Olmedo's wife that killed her. He had been suspended from practice for four years and yet when he came back he continued to be highly successful. He was not disappointed to learn that Major Olmedo had been killed, only anxious that he did not want his career to be further jeopardized with suspicion and allegations.

== Reviews ==
According to blogger Maxine Clarke, the book is excellent in its characterization, which gets easily into the minds and feelings of any kind of character and makes each person as readily accessible as the protagonist.
