= Eugenio Lopez =

Eugenio Lopez may refer to:

== Philippines ==
- Eugenio Lopez, Sr., original owner of the Manila Chronicle and founder of Chronicle Broadcasting Network
- Eugenio Lopez, Jr., former CEO and president of then ABS-CBN Broadcasting Corporation (now ABS-CBN Corporation)
- Eugenio Lopez III, former President(1993-1997; 2006-2008) CEO (1993-2013) and chairman (1997-2018) of ABS-CBN Corporation, elected as chairman emeritus since 2018.

== Mexico ==
- "Eugenio López Alonso- Jumex
