= Kingdom of Tavolara =

Micronation

Kingdom of Tavolara Regno di Tavolara
- Micronation (unrecognized entity)
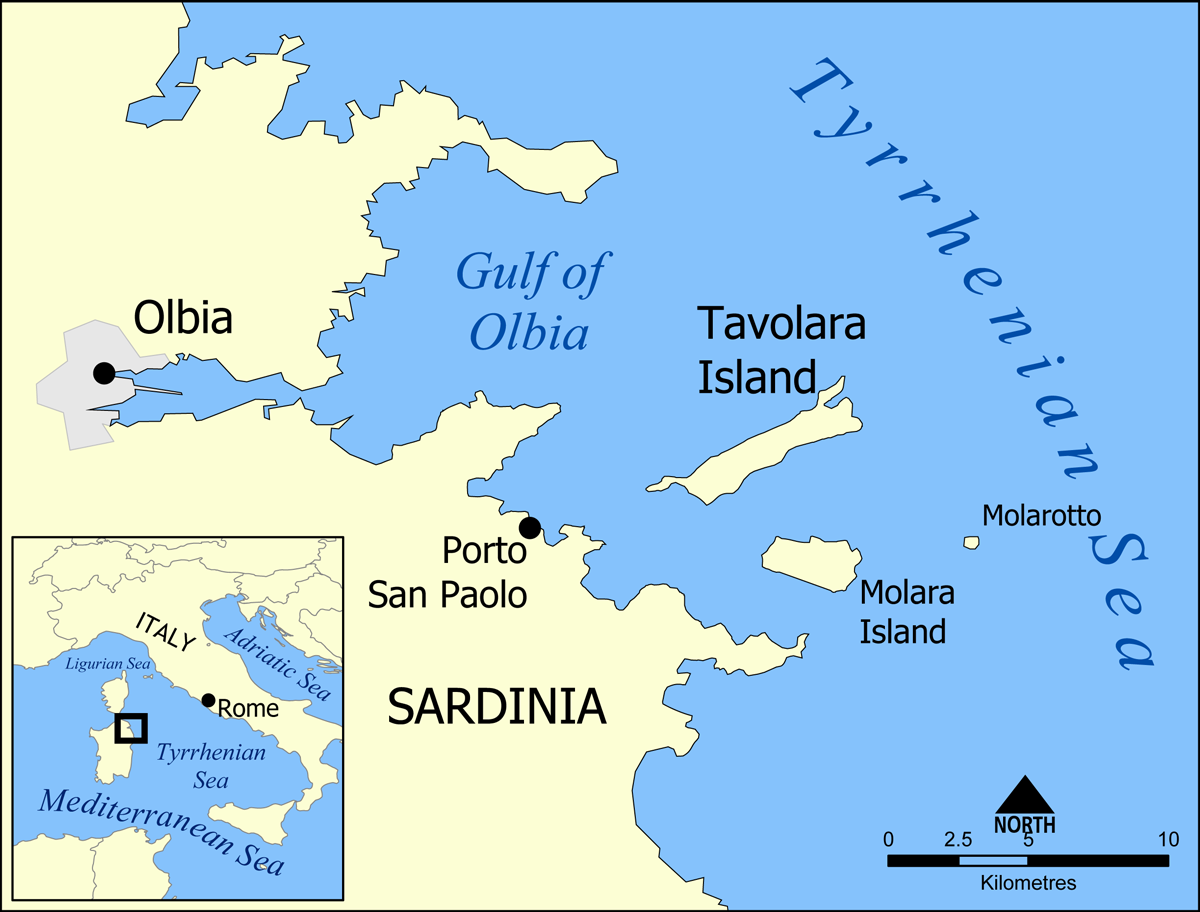
- Area claimed: 5 km^{2} (1.9 sq mi)
- Claimed by: Giuseppe; Paolo II
- Dates claimed: 1836–present

The Kingdom of Tavolara is a purported micronation on Tavolara Island, off the northeast coast of Sardinia. Set up by the Bertoleoni family, allegedly sanctioned by Charles Albert, King of Sardinia, it claims to be one of the smallest kingdoms in the world.

The island was known in ancient times as Hermea. According to tradition, Pope Pontian died in Tavolara following his abdication and exile in 235. It is probably the island previously called Tolar, which was used by some Arab ships in 848–849 as a base to attack nearby coasts.

Joachim Murat visited Tavolara in 1815 during his attempt to regain the Kingdom of Naples. At that time the island was uninhabited.

Giuseppe Bertoleoni claimed to be its monarch. When he died in the 1840s, his eldest son became King Paolo I. During his reign, in 1861 the Italian government paid 12,000 Italian lire for land at the northeast end of the island to build a lighthouse, which began operating in 1868. After Paolo's death in 1886, a number of newspapers published the report that according to his will, the island had become a republic. The New York Times described a government (supposedly recognized by Italy in 1887) with a president and council of six elected every six years by a vote of the people, regardless of gender. Others reported on Tavolara's alleged third presidential election in 1896. These reports, however, did not end the Bertoleoni kingdom. The third king of Tavolara was Carlo I, who was succeeded upon his death in 1928 by his son King Paolo II. Paolo went abroad, however, and left Carlo's sister Mariangela as regent in his absence. Mariangela died in 1934, leaving the kingdom to Italy. Her nephew Paolo II still claimed the kingdom until he died in 1962, a year that marked the installation of a NATO station on the island.

The present head of the Bertoleoni family is Tonino Bertoleoni, who runs "Da Tonino", a restaurant on the island. Politically, the interests of the micronation are represented in its external dealings by Ernesto Geremia of La Spezia, Liguria, Italy, who has written a history of the island.

The tomb of Paolo I is in the graveyard on the island, surmounted by a crown.

== See also ==
- List of islands of Italy

== Sources ==
- Geremia, Ernesto Carlo; Gino Ragnetti (2005). Tavolara – l'Isola dei Re. ISBN 88-425-3441-2.
