= Eugenio Fuentes =

Spanish writer

Eugenio Fuentes (born 1958 in Montehermoso, Cáceres), is an acclaimed Spanish novelist. Four of his novels have been translated into English, the crime novels The Depths of the Forest, The Blood of the Angels, The Pianist's Hands and At Close Quarters all published by Arcadia.

== Bibliography ==
=== Novels ===
- Las batallas de Breda (1990)
- El nacimiento de Cupido (Premio Internacional de novela de Ciudad de San Fernando Luis Berenguer, 1993)
- Tantas mentiras (Premio de Novela Extremadura, 1997)
- El interior del bosque (1999); published in English as The depths of the forest
- La sangre de los angeles (2001); published in English as The blood of the angels
- Las manos del pianista (2003); published in English as The pianist's hands
- Venas de nieve (2005)
- Cuerpo a cuerpo (2007); published in English as At Close Quarters
- Contrarreloj (2009)

=== Short stories ===
- Vías muertas (1997).
