= Eugenio Faxas =

Dominican Republic golfer

Eugenio Faxas (1924–1999) was a Dominican golfer internationally recognized by his achievements and contributions to the development of golf in The Dominican Republic.

== Early life ==
Eugenio Faxas was born in San Francisco de Macorís in the Dominican Republic. Having a natural inclination for sports, Faxas played baseball at the old parks located in his home town.

By the age of nine, he started working at a small food store to support his six family members. However, this did not prevent his wishes of playing baseball professionally. At the age of nineteen Faxas decided to study business at the Autonomous University of Santo Domingo.

== Professional career ==
Once having improved his financial situation, and having not played baseball for a long time, at the age of thirty Faxas had the opportunity and the necessary connections to start playing golf as a hobby and informally, not knowing his future impact on the growth of golf in the Dominican Republic, and his later achievements as a golfer. Faxas won the three straight first rank in his first golf national match, made by the Dominican Golf Association, at Santiago Golf Club.

== Personal life ==
Faxas married Teresa Vargas and they had five children: Pelayo, Laura, Juan, Angel, and Patricio. His daughter, Laura Faxas, was the Ambassador of the Dominican Republic at UNESCO in Paris, France, and his son, Angel "El Mono" Faxas, is the Director of Direccion General de Ganaderia, the government office in the Dominican Republic that works with livestock.
