= Eugenio Tandonnet =

French utopian socialist

Eugenio Tandonnet was a French utopian socialist, who lived in Uruguay and Brazil during longer periods. Tandonnet was a follower of Charles Fourier. In 1845 he founded Revista Socialista in Brazil.
