= Bertoleoni family =

Italian micronation ruling family

Coat of arms of the Kingdom of Tavolara

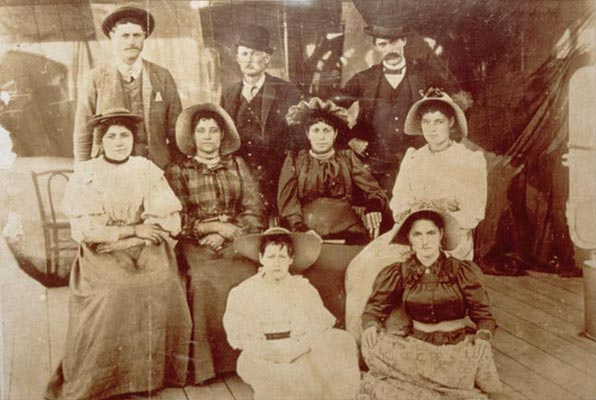
King Carlo I Bertoleoni and his family, which the Bertoleoni family informs was displayed in Buckingham Palace with the caption "The royal family of Tavolara, in the gulf of Terranova, the smallest kingdom in the world."

Bertoleoni is the proclaimed ruling family of the styled "Kingdom of Tavolara" (Sardinia, Italy), which claimed to be "the smallest kingdom of the world". The members of this family were also the only inhabitants of this island (whose land is owned partly by the Marzano family in Rome, and partly by a NATO military base) that had been abandoned in 1962. The island was claimed by Italy, however, it was never officially annexed and therefore this does not abolish any prior royal titles. The people of the island sustained themselves by goat farming and fishing. Currently, the supposed kingdom is a tourist attraction for the 57 or so native inhabitants of the island, where the current king and crown princess run its two restaurants and sell souvenirs to visitors of the Natural Park. The family has more influence over the island than anyone else.

A Giuseppe Bertoleoni informed that during a hunting trip, Charles Albert, King of Sardinia, verbally appointed him "king of Tavolara" in 1836. According to Giuseppe Bertoleoni, Charles Albert also (verbally) sanctioned the use of the title Prince for the oldest male heir, and the titles "Lord of the Islands" (Signore delle Isole) and "Lady of the Sea" (Signora del Mare) for the younger children of the king. Evidence for this was a scroll written by the prince later that confirmed officiating him as king.

The present claimant to the throne is King Tonino, an Italian citizen who runs Da Tonino, a restaurant on the island.

== Giuseppe (1836–1845) ==
Born December 20, 1778, on the nearby island of La Maddalena, Giuseppe Celestino Bertoleoni Poli was a shepherd and the only inhabitant of the island before Charles Albert, the King of Sardinia's visit. He claimed to have impressed him as an educated man and to have been made king of the island shortly thereafter. He brought his two families from other islands to live with him. The Italian government tried to prosecute him for bigamy, but failed because of his title. Passed kingdom to son Paolo in 1845; died 1849. Giuseppe's origins are a mystery. Because he claimed to be more highly educated than the average Sardinian shepherd, some have speculated on no ground that he was a fugitive member of the Carbonari, an exiled French aristocrat, or even the Lost Dauphin.

== Paolo I (1845–1886) ==
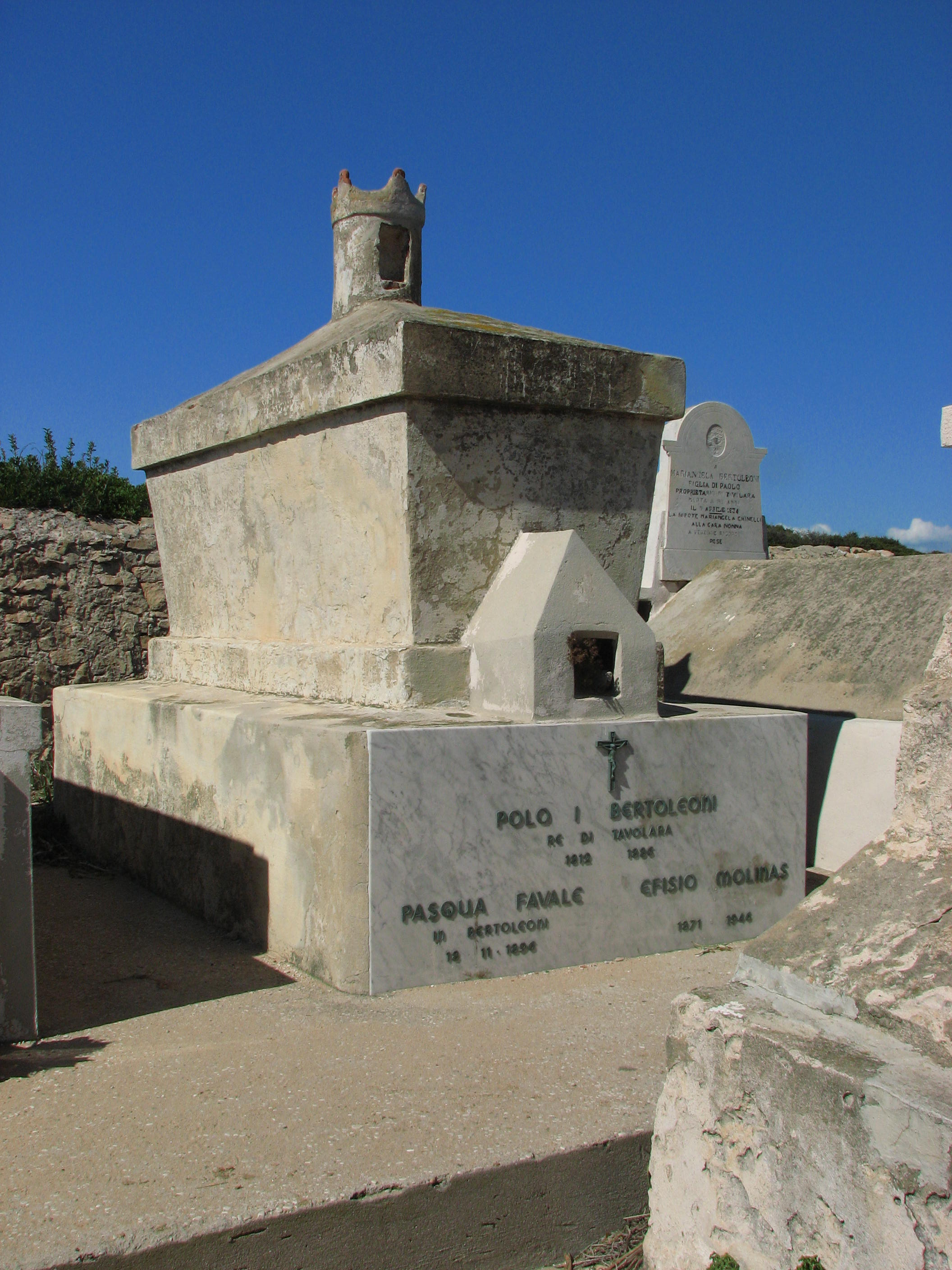
Royal tomb of Paolo I and Pasqua Favale

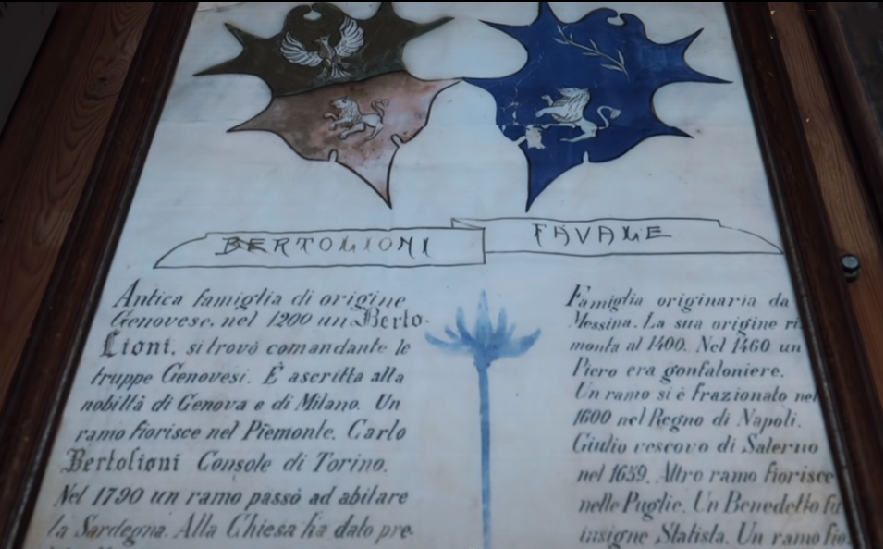
Charter of Tavolara

Son of Giuseppe Bertoleoni and Laura Ornano, born 1815. In 1839 he visited King Charles Albert in Turin and obtained a royal charter to Tavolara. During this period, the Italian patriot Giuseppe Garibaldi was associated with the Bertoleoni family, often visiting Paolo's relatives on the islands of La Maddalena and Caprera.

After the creation of the Italian Kingdom in 1861, Paolo pressed to obtain recognition after meeting with King Carto Alberto. After he fell ill in 1882, his wife Pasqua Favale acted as regent until his death on May 30, 1886. A number of newspapers published the report that on his deathbed he asked that the kingdom die with him, and that his family therefore established a republic. These reports, however, were erroneous.

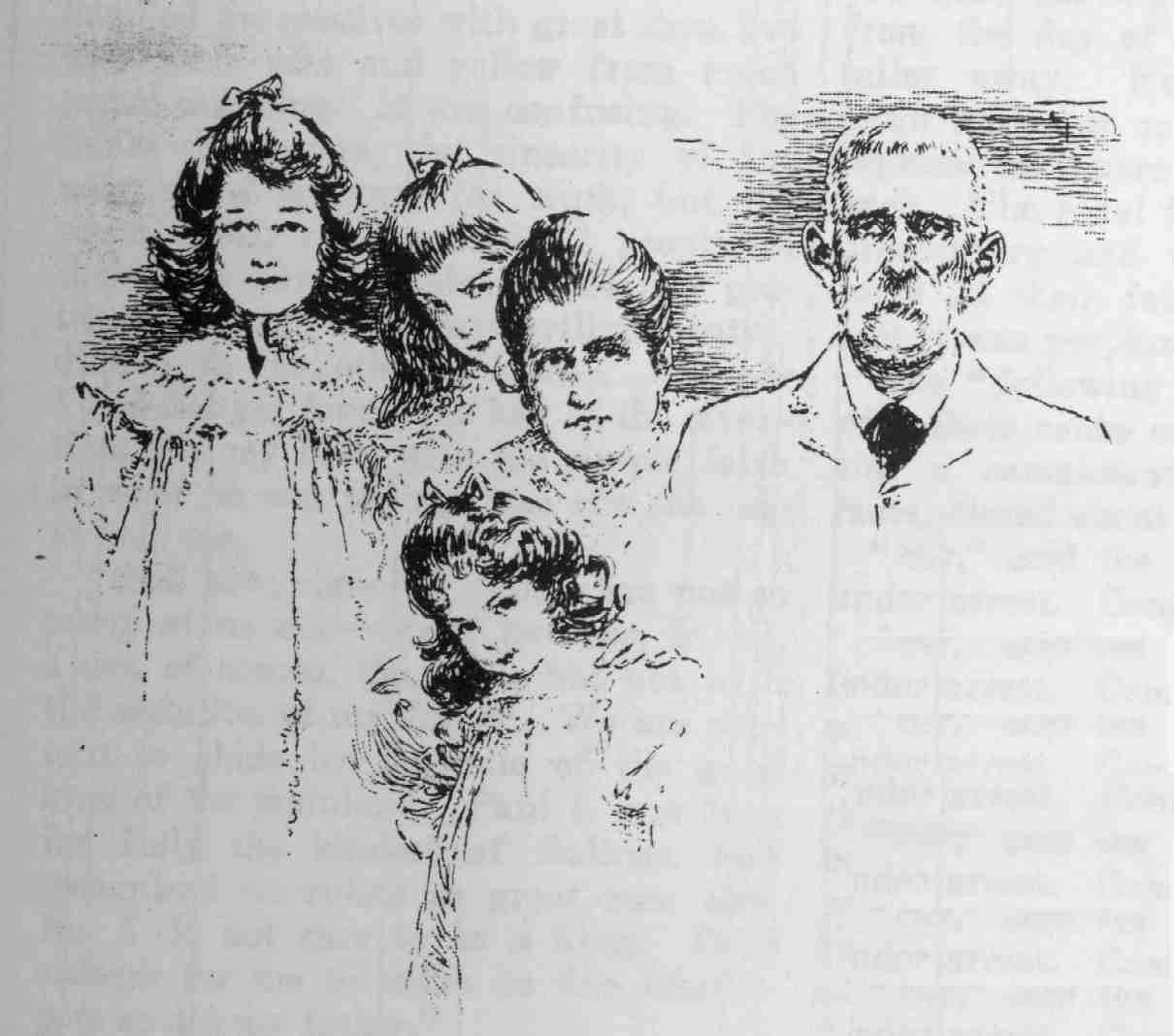
King Carlo I, royal consort Maddalena Favale, and three Ladies of the Sea (Hale, 1904).

== Carlo I (1886–1927) ==
Son of Paolo I and Pasqua Favale, born 1845. In the summer of 1900 the British naval vessel HMS Vulcan visited Tavolara, and the officers took a photograph of King Carlo and his family to hang in Queen Victoria's collection of royal portraits in Buckingham Palace. By 1904, however, Carlo was king in name only, having no ambition to rule. He is reported to have said, "I do not care to be a king. It is enough for me to make as fine lobster-pots as did my father." He was persuaded to reign, however, until his death, which was reported either Nov 6, 1927, at Olbia, or Jan 31, 1928, at Ventimiglia on the Italian Riviera.

== Mariangela (1927–1929) ==
Daughter of Paolo I and Pasqua Favale, born 1841, she took up the crown at the request of her nephew Paolo (Carlo's son and designated successor) during his absence from the island (he had left the island looking for a job). When Mariangela died April 6, 1934, it was reported that Italy would inherit the kingdom.

== Paolo II (1929–1962) ==
Son of Carlo I and Maddalena Favale, born 1897. Married 1930 to Italia Murru and initiated a renaissance of the monarchy. Appointed his cousin Prince Ernesto Carlo Geremia as Lieutenant General of the Kingdom. After Paolo's death Dec 2, 1962, the widowed Queen Italia Murru retired to Porto San Paolo on Sardinia, wintering at Capo Testa, until her death in 2003 at age 95. Paolo II was the last to actively rule Tavolara (numbering then about 50 inhabitants). At the end of his reign, half the island was occupied by a NATO military installation.

== Carlo II (1962–1993) ==
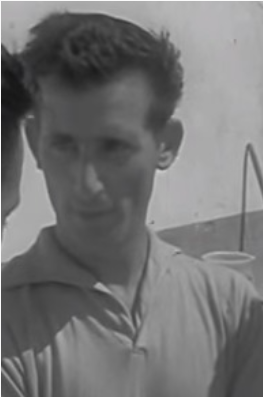
Image of Carlo Bertoleoni ll taken in 1958

Eldest son of Paolo II and Italia Murru, born 1931. Married, no issue. Died May 1993 at Capo Testa, Sardinia. During the 1960s and 70s, his cousins Maria Molinas Bertoleoni (1869–1974) and Laura Molinas Bertoleoni (d. 1979), both daughters of Mariangela and Bachisio Molinas, also laid claim to the vacant "throne".

== Tonino (1993–present) ==
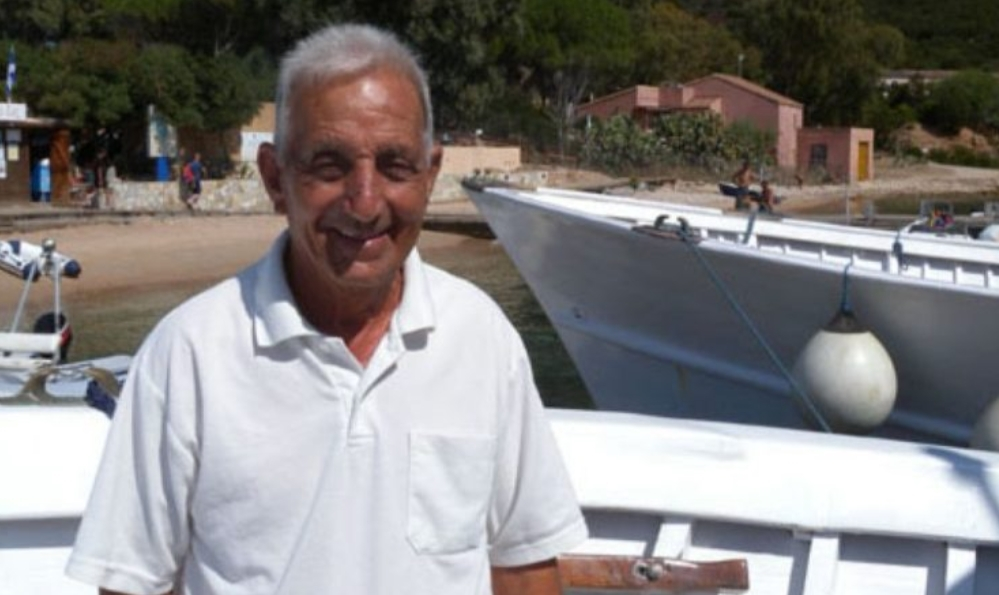
Tonino Bertoleoni the current head of the family, in 2021

Antonio (Tonino) Bertoleoni, second son of Paolo II and Italia Murru, was born in 1933. He is the owner of Da Tonino restaurant; his sister Princess Maddalena owns La Corona restaurant nearby. Following the return of Vittorio Emanuele of Naples to his native Italy in 2002, Tonino vowed an appeal to him, as heir to the House of Savoy, for recognition of the Tavolaran kingdom. Tonino's children by Maria "Pompea" Romano (1932–2010) are Loredana, Paola, and Giuseppe (Tonino's heir and current "Lord of the Isles"). Not much is known about him, but what is known is that he runs a family restaurant on the island and they also sell souvenirs. Bertoleoni's everyday life consists of simple activities such as fishing, gardening, and taking long walks around Tavolara.

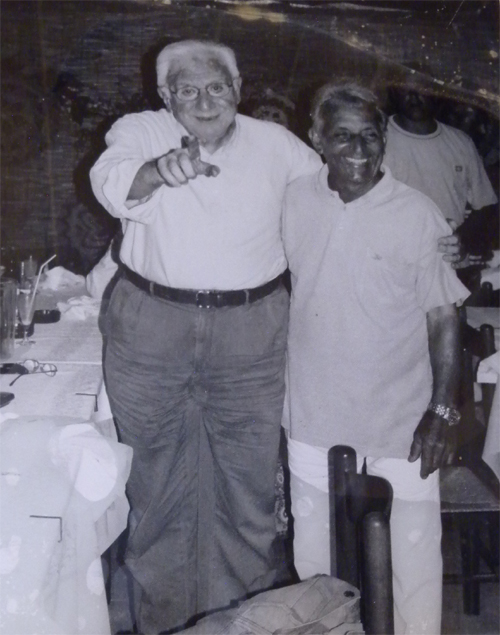
Italian President of the Republic, Francesco Cossiga, visits King Tonino

== Bibliography ==
- AA.VV., Una montagna in mezzo al mare, ed. Taphros 2005.
- Della Marmora, Alberto. Viaggio in Sardegna, Forni, Bologna 1985.
- Finelli, Riccardo. C'è di mezzo il mare - Viaggio nelle micro-isole italiane, Incontri ed., Sassuolo 2008.
- Fioretti, Ovidio. "La corona senza reame," Almanacco di Cagliari 1989.
- Fumi, Alberto (Aug 22, 1991). "Tavolara e il suo Re". La Stampa. p. 14.
- Geremia, Ernesto Carlo, and Gino Ragnetti (2005), Tavolara - l'Isola dei Re, Mursia, Milano. ISBN 88-425-3441-2.
- Graziani, Graziano. Stati d'eccezione, ed. dell'Asino, Roma 2012.
- Hale, Walter (Nov 1904). "The Search for a Lost Republic". Harper's Monthly Magazine. CIX (DCXLIX): 929–936.
- Manca, Tania. Viaggiatori europei. Dall'esplorazione del mondo al viaggio in Sardegna (700 e 800), Carlo Delfino, Sassari 2005.
- Mazzucchelli, Mario. Gioacchino Murat, Dall'Oglio, Milano 1962.
- Murineddu (a cura di), Antonio. Gallura, Fossataro, Cagliari 1962.
- Papurello, Alfredina. Tavolara Signora del Mare, Carlo Delfino, Sassari 2012.
- Sotgiu, Giovanna. Arcipelago di La Maddalena - 1839-1843 - La Divisione delle terre - Giuseppe Bertoleoni Re di Tavolara, Lo Scoglio, La Maddalena 2002.
- Tribuna Araldica, Famiglie di Genova, estinte e viventi, nobili e popolari, ed.Europea di Araldica, parte 1, Genova 1983.
- Valery, Antoine Claude. Viaggio in Sardegna, Ilisso, Nuoro 1999.
