= Eugenio Agneni =

Italian painter (1816–1879)

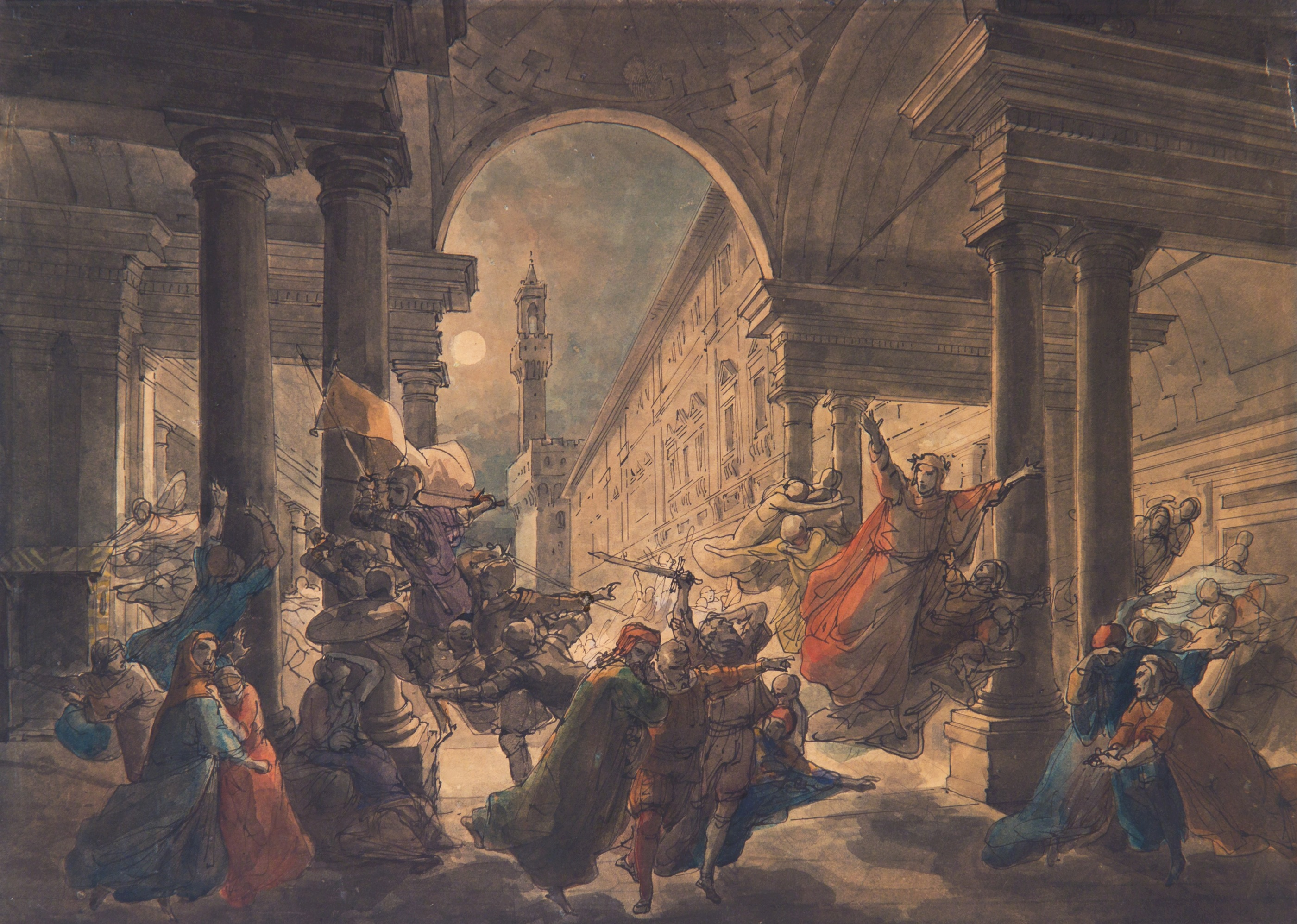
Le ombre dei grandi uomini fiorentini che protestano contro il dominio straniero

Eugenio Agneni or Agnèni ( January 26, 1816 – May 25, 1879) was an Italian painter, mainly of historic canvases.

== Biography ==
He was born in Sutri, Province of Viterbo. Starting in 1833 in Rome, he began working with the painters Erzoche and the painter Beretta of Bergamo., and finally studying with Francesco Coghetti in Rome. In 1847, helped decorate the throne room of the Palazzo Quirinale with frescoes. He also painted frescoes in the Villa Torlonia in Porta Pia. He painted episodes in the life of San Vicenzo di Paola for his chapel in Montecitorio. Agneni joined the insurgency that lead to the brief Roman Republic in 1849.

When the papal government was restored, Agneni was forced to flee, and he went first to Savona, then Genoa (where he frescoed the Palazzo Rocca), then Florence, then Paris, and finally London, where he painted mythologic themes the ceiling of the Queen's loggia in the Royal Opera House at Covent Garden and Buckingham Palace. In 1859 and 1866, he returned to Italy to join the Garibaldini, in the quest for Italian independence and unity. He then returned to Florence, and finally to Rome in 1870–1871.

In Rome, he was named by Pope Pius IX to be Capitain of the Civil Guards. With the entry of the Papal States into the state of Italy, he continued to work for the City of Rome. He painted a Departed Spirits of Great Florentines Protest Foreign Invasions once at Museo Civico of Turin.

Agneni died in 1879 in Frascati.

== Notes ==
- See also obituary in Emporium journal.
