= Marcello Pirani =

German physicist (1880–1968)

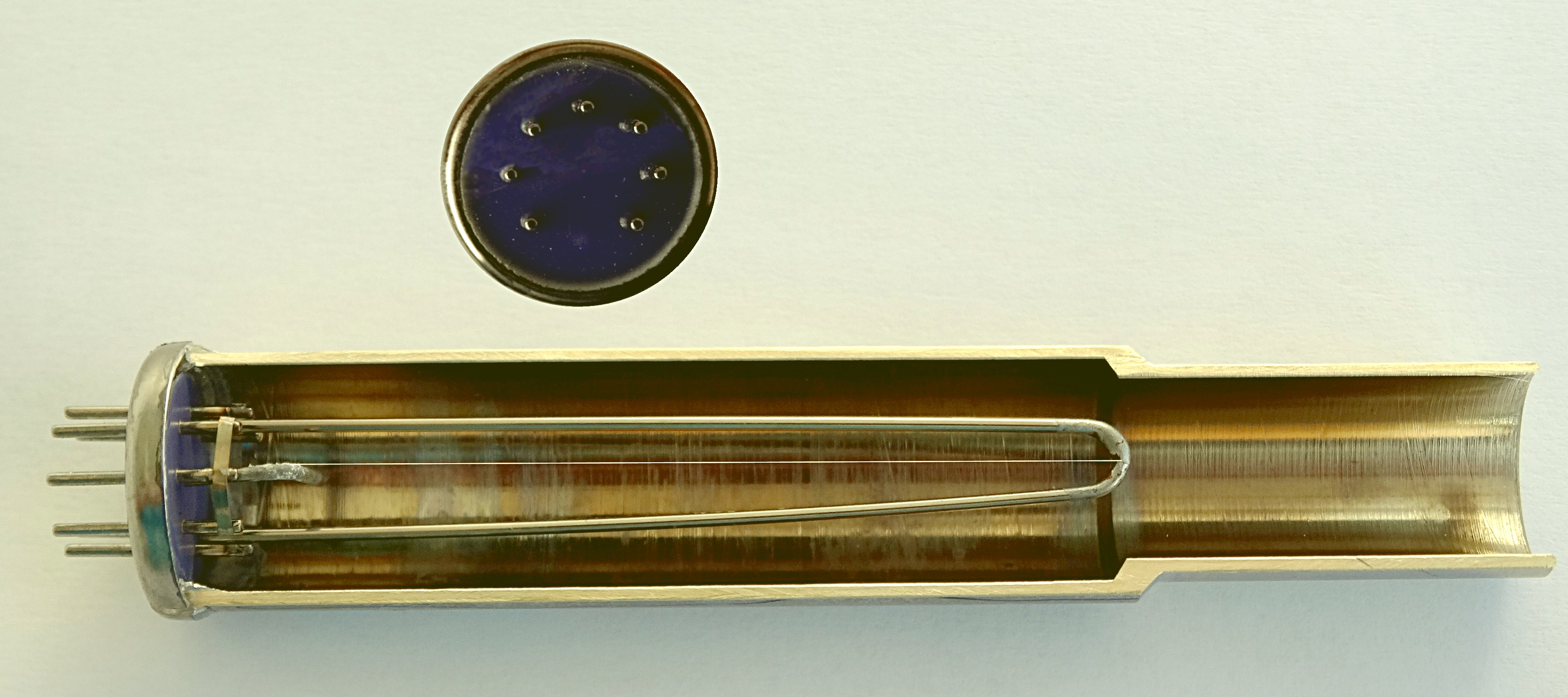
Pirani probe, opened

Marcello Stefano Pirani (July 1, 1880 – January 11, 1968) was a German physicist known for his invention of the Pirani vacuum gauge, a vacuum gauge based on the principle of heat loss measurement. Throughout his career, he worked on advancing lighting technology and pioneered work on the physics of gas discharge.

== Biography ==
Marcello Pirani was born on 1 July 1880 in Berlin, the son of the Italian composer Eugenio di Pirani (1852–1939) and his German Jewish wife, Clara (née Schönlank). Starting in 1899, he studied mathematics and physics at the University of Berlin. In 1903, he was granted a PhD for his measurements of the dielectric constant of solids in the group of Emil Warburg. He then moved to the Technische Hochschule in Aachen (now RWTH Aachen University) as an assistant at the Physikalischen Institut of this university.

In 1904, he joined the light bulb factory (Glühlampenwerk) of Siemens & Halske AG in Berlin, where he remained for the next fifteen years. At the age of 25, in 1905, he was promoted to head of the development lab of the light bulb factory.

In 1906, he made his most important invention with the development of a new type of vacuum gauge that today bears his name, the Pirani gauge. It is based on measuring the pressure dependence of heat loss from a hot wire by heat transfer to the surrounding gas and walls. In particular, it employs the change in resistivity of the heated wire (in Pirani's original work consisting of tantalum and platinum; today, tungsten, platinum, and nickel are commonly used) with temperature to determine the heat loss. Its useful measurement range lies within 10^{−4} mbar up to 1000 mbar.

Four years later, he finished his habilitation on optical measurements of high temperatures and studies on the relationship between temperature and emissivity of hot solids and was appointed Privatdozent at the Technische Hochschule in Charlottenburg (now Technische Universität Berlin). During the First World War, he enlisted in the army to deal with scientific-technical problems such as wireless telegraphy.

In 1918, Pirani was promoted Titular-Professor at the TU Berlin-Charlottenburg. One year later, he co-founded the Deutsche Gesellschaft für Metallkunde (German society for metal science) in Berlin.

From 1919 to 1936, he worked for the newly formed Osram company. As head of the scientific-technical bureau, he was in charge of coordinating and pushing scientific work in the field of light bulbs of the three founding companies Siemens & Halske, AEG and the Auergesellschaft. In this time fall his pioneering contributions to the advancement of lighting technology, in particular in the field of gas-discharge lamps: In 1922, he was named außerordentlicher Professor at the TU Berlin. In 1928, he became head of the Studiengesellschaft for electrical lighting of the Osram GmbH. He wrote a textbook on heat generation from electrical sources in 1930.

As his mother — Clara Schönlank — was Jewish, with the rise of the Nazi Party to power in Germany he left Germany in 1936 for England and joined the research lab of General Electric Co. Ltd. in Wembley. There his work focused on gas discharge lamps and high temperature resistant materials. From 1941 to 1947, he served as scientific consultant for the British Coal Utilization Research Association in London, working on new high temperature resistant materials involving carbon. Between 1947 and 1952, he was scientific consultant for the British-American Research Ltd., also in London.

In 1953, he returned to Germany as one of the few second world war repatriates with a scientific background. He first moved to Munich and from 1955 to his hometown, Berlin. In 1954, he took up a consultant position with Osram working on problems in gas discharge, glass and ceramics up to an old age. Pirani died in Berlin on January 11, 1968.

== Awards ==
- 1933 Honorary member of the Lichttechnischen Gesellschaft
- 1933 Gauß-Weber-Medal of the University Göttingen
- 1961 Federal Cross of Merit 1. class of the Federal Republic of Germany
