= Eugenio Arbones =

Spanish physician and politician

Member of the Congress of Deputies
- In office July 10, 1931 – October 9, 1933
- Constituency: Pontevedra

Personal details
- Born: Eugenio Arbones Castellanzuelo; 1884; Ponteareas, Kingdom of Spain
- Died: September 15, 1936 (aged 51–52); Vigo, Spanish Republic
- Political party: PSOE
- Occupation: Physician, politician

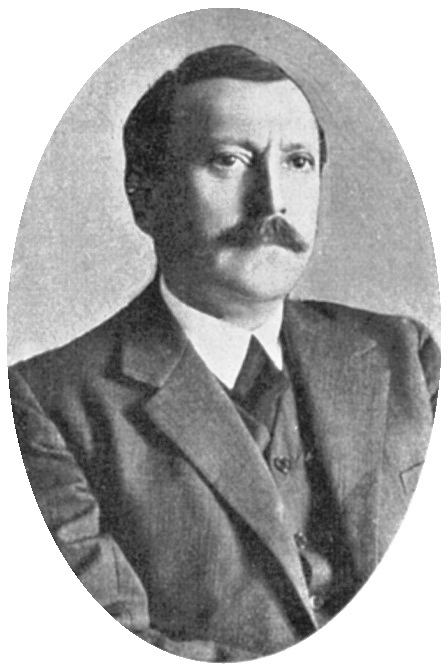
Eugenio Arbones Castellanzuelo.

Eugenio Arbones (1884, Ponteareas – 1936, Vigo) was a Spanish physician and socialist politician. He was a member of the Spanish Socialist Workers' Party and assassinated during the Spanish Civil War.
