= Eugenio di Pirani =

Italian pianist, music educator and composer (1852–1939)

Eugenio Pirani
- Also known as: Eugenio di Pirani
- Born: Eugenio Pirani; September 8, 1852; Cento, Ferrara, Italy
- Died: January 12, 1939 (aged 86) Berlin, Germany
- Occupations: Pianist, composer, music educator, music critic
- Instrument: Piano

Eugenio Pirani (also known as Eugenio di Pirani; 8 September 1852 (Note: Some sources give 9 September 1852 (e.g., the Kalliope Verbund and others Bologna as his place of birth.) – 12 January 1939) was an Italian pianist, music educator, composer, and critic. He spent much of his career in Germany, while also touring widely across Europe and later working in the United States. He was the father of the German physicist Marcello Pirani.

== Life and career ==
Pirani studied at the Liceo Musicale di Bologna with the pianist-composer Stefano Golinelli, completing his studies in 1869. He continued his training in Berlin, studying piano with Theodor Kullak and composition with Friedrich Kiel. In 1870 he was appointed to teach at Kullak’s music academy in Berlin, where he taught from 1870 to about 1881 while maintaining an active concert career in several European countries, including Italy, England, France, and Russia. Later, he lived in Heidelberg for a period and returned to Berlin in 1895, where he worked as a correspondent for Italian publications and, from 1898, as a music critic for the Berlin periodical Kleines Journal.

From 1901, Pirani toured as an accompanist to the American singer Alma Webster-Powell. He subsequently relocated to the United States and, in Brooklyn, co-founded the Powell–Pirani Music Institute with Webster-Powell. He later returned to Berlin, where he spent his final years.

== Works ==
Pirani composed stage, orchestral, chamber, and piano music. His best-known works included the opera Das Hexenlied (Prague, 1902), a symphonic poem associated with Heidelberg Castle (often titled Im Heidelberger Schloss), and Venetian Scenes (Scene veneziane) for piano and orchestra. His catalogue also includes other orchestral pieces (including a ballet), chamber music (such as piano trios and a piano quartet), and numerous works for solo piano (including concert études and character pieces).

== Writings ==
Pirani also published writings on music and performance, including Die Hochschule des Klavierspiels (Berlin, 1908) and Secrets of the Success of Great Musicians (Philadelphia, 1922).
