= Giovanni Consolini =

Italian composer

Giovanni Consolini (1818–1906) was an Italian composer. His opera Il conte di Salto premiered at the Teatro Chiabrera in Savona on 21 January 1894. He was also known for his opera La finta pazza.

== Sources ==
- University of Toronto Libraries, Catalog entry:Ser Gregorio; melodramma giocoso in due atti. Espressamente scritta pel Teatro Re, il carnevale 1847-48
