= Eugenio Cantatore =

Italian electrical engineer

Eugenio Cantatore is an Italian electrical engineer at the Eindhoven University of Technology, Netherlands.

Cantatore was named a Fellow of the Institute of Electrical and Electronics Engineers (IEEE) in 2016 for his contributions to the design of circuits with organic thin film transistors.

Cantatore obtained his Master's and Ph.D. degrees in electrical engineering from the Polytechnic University of Bari, in 1993 and 1997 respectively. From 1997 to 1999 he was fellow at CERN, Geneva and after it, moved to Philips Natuurkundig Laboratorium in Eindhoven, Netherlands. There he served as senior scientist until 2007 when he joined the Eindhoven University of Technology, where he is serving as full professor since 2016. Since that year, he is also a member of the SSCS Adcom and the ISSCC Executive Committee.
