= Eugenio Consolini =

Italian noble

Eugenio Consolini (15 May 1913 in Brazil – 20 April 20 1996 in São Fidélis, Brazil) was an Italian noble.

Consolini was the son of Adriano Giuseppe Gaetano Consolini, of the marquises of Consolini, and Teresa Tonello. He was also the nephew of Cardinal Domenico Consolini. Consolini was born in Brazil his father having moved there from Terni, Italy in 1898 due to the persecutions against ecclesiastical nobles after the Italian unification.

== Genealogy of the Marquises of Consolini ==
- Tommaso Consolini - Marquis of Senigaglia, vice consul of France in Senigaglia
- Pietro Consolini, son of Tommaso Consolini, appointed Marquis of Senigaglia by Pope Gregory XVI in 1842
