= Eugenio de Salazar =

Spanish explorer

Eugenio de Salazar (born circa 1530) was a Spanish jurist and writer who crossed the Atlantic in the 16th century. De Salazar made the journey with his wife and family in 1573.

== Life and works ==
Salazar was the son of Pedro de Salazar, of Madrid, and Maria de Alarcon. He studied law in Alcalá de Henares, then Salamanca, and finally in Sigüenza, obtaining the title of Licentiate. He had a distinguished career in the Spanish colonial service, as Governor of Tenerife in the Canaries and judge in the courts of Guatemala and Mexico. In 1582, he sailed for Mexico City, having served as oidor (both judge and magistrate) in Audiencia de Guatemala for six years. He was soon installed as fiscal of the Audiencia de Mexico; letters of his detailing his attempts to address important issues of the day to the king, Philip II, survive to the present.
