= Eugenio Tavolara =

Italian artist (1901–1963)

Eugenio Tavolara (1901–1963) was an artist born in Sassari, Sardinia, Italy, with interests in many disciplines. He is well known for his hand-crafted "toys", most prominently small statues in terracotta representing Sardinians in traditional costumes. In a 2007 tribute exhibition, 14 Sardian artists reinterpreted his works.
