= Eugénio Neves =

Portuguese footballer (born 1987)

Personal information
- Full name: Eugénio André Calesso das Neves
- Date of birth: 27 August 1987 (age 39)
- Place of birth: Lisbon, Portugal
- Height: 1.83 m (6 ft 0 in)
- Position: Forward

Youth career
- Sporting CP
- Futebol Benfica
- Águias Musgueira

Senior career*
Years	Team	Apps	(Gls)
2006–2008	Águias Musgueira	35	(20)
2008–2010	Nea Salamis	19	(3)
2010	AEK Larnaca	6	(0)
2010–2011	Digenis Morphou	43	(13)
2011–2012	Akritas Chloraka		
2013–2014	Zeravani		
2015–2016	U.D. Alta de Lisboa	4	(0)
- * Club domestic league appearances and goals as of 1 June 2011

Eugenio André Calesso das Neves (born 27 August 1987 in Lisbon) is a Portuguese footballer who played as a forward for club U.D. Alta de Lisboa.
